

112001–112100 

|-bgcolor=#d6d6d6
| 112001 ||  || — || April 12, 2002 || Palomar || NEAT || — || align=right | 6.5 km || 
|-id=002 bgcolor=#fefefe
| 112002 ||  || — || April 12, 2002 || Kitt Peak || Spacewatch || V || align=right | 1.2 km || 
|-id=003 bgcolor=#fefefe
| 112003 ||  || — || April 13, 2002 || Palomar || NEAT || — || align=right | 2.2 km || 
|-id=004 bgcolor=#d6d6d6
| 112004 ||  || — || April 11, 2002 || Palomar || NEAT || — || align=right | 4.8 km || 
|-id=005 bgcolor=#fefefe
| 112005 ||  || — || April 13, 2002 || Palomar || NEAT || — || align=right | 1.9 km || 
|-id=006 bgcolor=#fefefe
| 112006 ||  || — || April 14, 2002 || Socorro || LINEAR || — || align=right | 1.3 km || 
|-id=007 bgcolor=#E9E9E9
| 112007 ||  || — || April 12, 2002 || Palomar || NEAT || — || align=right | 2.4 km || 
|-id=008 bgcolor=#d6d6d6
| 112008 ||  || — || April 12, 2002 || Palomar || NEAT || — || align=right | 10 km || 
|-id=009 bgcolor=#fefefe
| 112009 ||  || — || April 13, 2002 || Palomar || NEAT || — || align=right | 1.4 km || 
|-id=010 bgcolor=#fefefe
| 112010 ||  || — || April 13, 2002 || Palomar || NEAT || — || align=right | 1.6 km || 
|-id=011 bgcolor=#fefefe
| 112011 ||  || — || April 13, 2002 || Palomar || NEAT || — || align=right | 1.6 km || 
|-id=012 bgcolor=#fefefe
| 112012 ||  || — || April 14, 2002 || Socorro || LINEAR || FLO || align=right | 1.6 km || 
|-id=013 bgcolor=#E9E9E9
| 112013 ||  || — || April 14, 2002 || Palomar || NEAT || — || align=right | 3.4 km || 
|-id=014 bgcolor=#fefefe
| 112014 ||  || — || April 14, 2002 || Palomar || NEAT || NYS || align=right | 1.4 km || 
|-id=015 bgcolor=#fefefe
| 112015 ||  || — || April 14, 2002 || Palomar || NEAT || — || align=right | 1.3 km || 
|-id=016 bgcolor=#fefefe
| 112016 ||  || — || April 14, 2002 || Palomar || NEAT || NYS || align=right | 1.0 km || 
|-id=017 bgcolor=#fefefe
| 112017 ||  || — || April 14, 2002 || Palomar || NEAT || — || align=right | 1.5 km || 
|-id=018 bgcolor=#fefefe
| 112018 ||  || — || April 14, 2002 || Palomar || NEAT || V || align=right | 1.8 km || 
|-id=019 bgcolor=#fefefe
| 112019 ||  || — || April 9, 2002 || Socorro || LINEAR || — || align=right | 1.9 km || 
|-id=020 bgcolor=#fefefe
| 112020 ||  || — || April 9, 2002 || Socorro || LINEAR || — || align=right | 1.6 km || 
|-id=021 bgcolor=#E9E9E9
| 112021 ||  || — || April 11, 2002 || Socorro || LINEAR || — || align=right | 3.1 km || 
|-id=022 bgcolor=#fefefe
| 112022 ||  || — || April 12, 2002 || Socorro || LINEAR || V || align=right | 1.4 km || 
|-id=023 bgcolor=#E9E9E9
| 112023 ||  || — || April 10, 2002 || Palomar || NEAT || — || align=right | 1.8 km || 
|-id=024 bgcolor=#fefefe
| 112024 ||  || — || April 16, 2002 || Socorro || LINEAR || V || align=right | 1.6 km || 
|-id=025 bgcolor=#fefefe
| 112025 ||  || — || April 16, 2002 || Socorro || LINEAR || — || align=right | 1.3 km || 
|-id=026 bgcolor=#fefefe
| 112026 ||  || — || April 16, 2002 || Socorro || LINEAR || — || align=right | 2.1 km || 
|-id=027 bgcolor=#fefefe
| 112027 ||  || — || April 16, 2002 || Socorro || LINEAR || FLO || align=right | 1.5 km || 
|-id=028 bgcolor=#fefefe
| 112028 ||  || — || April 18, 2002 || Haleakala || NEAT || — || align=right | 1.4 km || 
|-id=029 bgcolor=#fefefe
| 112029 ||  || — || April 19, 2002 || Palomar || NEAT || V || align=right | 1.1 km || 
|-id=030 bgcolor=#fefefe
| 112030 ||  || — || April 18, 2002 || Desert Eagle || W. K. Y. Yeung || — || align=right | 2.0 km || 
|-id=031 bgcolor=#E9E9E9
| 112031 ||  || — || April 18, 2002 || Desert Eagle || W. K. Y. Yeung || — || align=right | 2.5 km || 
|-id=032 bgcolor=#fefefe
| 112032 ||  || — || April 18, 2002 || Socorro || LINEAR || NYS || align=right | 1.2 km || 
|-id=033 bgcolor=#fefefe
| 112033 ||  || — || April 17, 2002 || Socorro || LINEAR || — || align=right | 1.4 km || 
|-id=034 bgcolor=#fefefe
| 112034 ||  || — || April 17, 2002 || Socorro || LINEAR || V || align=right | 1.4 km || 
|-id=035 bgcolor=#d6d6d6
| 112035 ||  || — || April 18, 2002 || Palomar || NEAT || — || align=right | 7.2 km || 
|-id=036 bgcolor=#fefefe
| 112036 ||  || — || April 30, 2002 || Palomar || NEAT || H || align=right | 1.4 km || 
|-id=037 bgcolor=#fefefe
| 112037 ||  || — || April 30, 2002 || Palomar || NEAT || — || align=right | 1.2 km || 
|-id=038 bgcolor=#fefefe
| 112038 ||  || — || April 30, 2002 || Palomar || NEAT || — || align=right | 2.0 km || 
|-id=039 bgcolor=#fefefe
| 112039 ||  || — || April 21, 2002 || Socorro || LINEAR || PHO || align=right | 2.7 km || 
|-id=040 bgcolor=#fefefe
| 112040 ||  || — || April 17, 2002 || Socorro || LINEAR || — || align=right | 1.9 km || 
|-id=041 bgcolor=#fefefe
| 112041 || 2002 JG || — || May 3, 2002 || Desert Eagle || W. K. Y. Yeung || FLO || align=right | 1.3 km || 
|-id=042 bgcolor=#fefefe
| 112042 ||  || — || May 4, 2002 || Desert Eagle || W. K. Y. Yeung || FLO || align=right | 1.3 km || 
|-id=043 bgcolor=#fefefe
| 112043 ||  || — || May 4, 2002 || Desert Eagle || W. K. Y. Yeung || FLO || align=right | 1.1 km || 
|-id=044 bgcolor=#E9E9E9
| 112044 ||  || — || May 5, 2002 || Socorro || LINEAR || — || align=right | 2.7 km || 
|-id=045 bgcolor=#fefefe
| 112045 ||  || — || May 5, 2002 || Socorro || LINEAR || H || align=right | 1.3 km || 
|-id=046 bgcolor=#d6d6d6
| 112046 ||  || — || May 4, 2002 || Palomar || NEAT || — || align=right | 6.0 km || 
|-id=047 bgcolor=#fefefe
| 112047 ||  || — || May 6, 2002 || Palomar || NEAT || ERI || align=right | 2.8 km || 
|-id=048 bgcolor=#fefefe
| 112048 ||  || — || May 6, 2002 || Palomar || NEAT || — || align=right | 1.8 km || 
|-id=049 bgcolor=#fefefe
| 112049 ||  || — || May 6, 2002 || Palomar || NEAT || — || align=right | 2.1 km || 
|-id=050 bgcolor=#fefefe
| 112050 ||  || — || May 7, 2002 || Tebbutt || F. B. Zoltowski || — || align=right | 1.3 km || 
|-id=051 bgcolor=#d6d6d6
| 112051 ||  || — || May 7, 2002 || Kitt Peak || Spacewatch || HYG || align=right | 6.0 km || 
|-id=052 bgcolor=#fefefe
| 112052 ||  || — || May 7, 2002 || Socorro || LINEAR || H || align=right | 1.7 km || 
|-id=053 bgcolor=#fefefe
| 112053 ||  || — || May 8, 2002 || Desert Eagle || W. K. Y. Yeung || NYS || align=right | 2.1 km || 
|-id=054 bgcolor=#fefefe
| 112054 ||  || — || May 8, 2002 || Desert Eagle || W. K. Y. Yeung || — || align=right | 1.9 km || 
|-id=055 bgcolor=#fefefe
| 112055 ||  || — || May 8, 2002 || Desert Eagle || W. K. Y. Yeung || NYS || align=right | 1.3 km || 
|-id=056 bgcolor=#E9E9E9
| 112056 ||  || — || May 8, 2002 || Desert Eagle || W. K. Y. Yeung || — || align=right | 3.0 km || 
|-id=057 bgcolor=#fefefe
| 112057 ||  || — || May 6, 2002 || Kitt Peak || Spacewatch || V || align=right | 1.3 km || 
|-id=058 bgcolor=#fefefe
| 112058 ||  || — || May 6, 2002 || Socorro || LINEAR || H || align=right | 1.6 km || 
|-id=059 bgcolor=#fefefe
| 112059 ||  || — || May 6, 2002 || Socorro || LINEAR || H || align=right | 1.2 km || 
|-id=060 bgcolor=#fefefe
| 112060 ||  || — || May 6, 2002 || Socorro || LINEAR || PHO || align=right | 2.4 km || 
|-id=061 bgcolor=#E9E9E9
| 112061 ||  || — || May 8, 2002 || Socorro || LINEAR || — || align=right | 5.3 km || 
|-id=062 bgcolor=#fefefe
| 112062 ||  || — || May 8, 2002 || Socorro || LINEAR || — || align=right | 1.3 km || 
|-id=063 bgcolor=#fefefe
| 112063 ||  || — || May 7, 2002 || Kleť || Kleť Obs. || H || align=right | 1.5 km || 
|-id=064 bgcolor=#fefefe
| 112064 ||  || — || May 8, 2002 || Socorro || LINEAR || — || align=right | 1.6 km || 
|-id=065 bgcolor=#fefefe
| 112065 ||  || — || May 8, 2002 || Socorro || LINEAR || H || align=right | 1.2 km || 
|-id=066 bgcolor=#fefefe
| 112066 ||  || — || May 7, 2002 || Palomar || NEAT || — || align=right | 1.9 km || 
|-id=067 bgcolor=#fefefe
| 112067 ||  || — || May 7, 2002 || Palomar || NEAT || — || align=right | 1.9 km || 
|-id=068 bgcolor=#fefefe
| 112068 ||  || — || May 7, 2002 || Palomar || NEAT || — || align=right | 1.4 km || 
|-id=069 bgcolor=#fefefe
| 112069 ||  || — || May 7, 2002 || Palomar || NEAT || NYS || align=right data-sort-value="0.94" | 940 m || 
|-id=070 bgcolor=#fefefe
| 112070 ||  || — || May 7, 2002 || Palomar || NEAT || — || align=right | 1.6 km || 
|-id=071 bgcolor=#fefefe
| 112071 ||  || — || May 7, 2002 || Palomar || NEAT || ERI || align=right | 3.2 km || 
|-id=072 bgcolor=#fefefe
| 112072 ||  || — || May 8, 2002 || Haleakala || NEAT || — || align=right | 1.6 km || 
|-id=073 bgcolor=#fefefe
| 112073 ||  || — || May 9, 2002 || Desert Eagle || W. K. Y. Yeung || — || align=right | 2.3 km || 
|-id=074 bgcolor=#fefefe
| 112074 ||  || — || May 7, 2002 || Socorro || LINEAR || — || align=right | 1.9 km || 
|-id=075 bgcolor=#fefefe
| 112075 ||  || — || May 8, 2002 || Socorro || LINEAR || — || align=right | 1.7 km || 
|-id=076 bgcolor=#fefefe
| 112076 ||  || — || May 8, 2002 || Socorro || LINEAR || — || align=right | 1.4 km || 
|-id=077 bgcolor=#fefefe
| 112077 ||  || — || May 8, 2002 || Socorro || LINEAR || — || align=right | 1.5 km || 
|-id=078 bgcolor=#fefefe
| 112078 ||  || — || May 8, 2002 || Socorro || LINEAR || — || align=right | 1.1 km || 
|-id=079 bgcolor=#fefefe
| 112079 ||  || — || May 8, 2002 || Socorro || LINEAR || NYS || align=right | 1.2 km || 
|-id=080 bgcolor=#fefefe
| 112080 ||  || — || May 8, 2002 || Socorro || LINEAR || V || align=right | 1.7 km || 
|-id=081 bgcolor=#E9E9E9
| 112081 ||  || — || May 8, 2002 || Socorro || LINEAR || — || align=right | 2.5 km || 
|-id=082 bgcolor=#fefefe
| 112082 ||  || — || May 8, 2002 || Socorro || LINEAR || — || align=right | 1.5 km || 
|-id=083 bgcolor=#fefefe
| 112083 ||  || — || May 8, 2002 || Socorro || LINEAR || — || align=right | 1.5 km || 
|-id=084 bgcolor=#fefefe
| 112084 ||  || — || May 8, 2002 || Socorro || LINEAR || — || align=right | 1.9 km || 
|-id=085 bgcolor=#d6d6d6
| 112085 ||  || — || May 8, 2002 || Socorro || LINEAR || — || align=right | 5.9 km || 
|-id=086 bgcolor=#fefefe
| 112086 ||  || — || May 8, 2002 || Socorro || LINEAR || — || align=right | 1.4 km || 
|-id=087 bgcolor=#fefefe
| 112087 ||  || — || May 9, 2002 || Socorro || LINEAR || V || align=right | 1.4 km || 
|-id=088 bgcolor=#fefefe
| 112088 ||  || — || May 9, 2002 || Socorro || LINEAR || — || align=right | 1.8 km || 
|-id=089 bgcolor=#fefefe
| 112089 ||  || — || May 9, 2002 || Socorro || LINEAR || V || align=right | 1.3 km || 
|-id=090 bgcolor=#E9E9E9
| 112090 ||  || — || May 9, 2002 || Socorro || LINEAR || WIT || align=right | 2.0 km || 
|-id=091 bgcolor=#fefefe
| 112091 ||  || — || May 9, 2002 || Socorro || LINEAR || — || align=right | 1.3 km || 
|-id=092 bgcolor=#fefefe
| 112092 ||  || — || May 9, 2002 || Socorro || LINEAR || V || align=right | 1.4 km || 
|-id=093 bgcolor=#fefefe
| 112093 ||  || — || May 9, 2002 || Socorro || LINEAR || FLO || align=right | 1.1 km || 
|-id=094 bgcolor=#E9E9E9
| 112094 ||  || — || May 9, 2002 || Socorro || LINEAR || — || align=right | 2.0 km || 
|-id=095 bgcolor=#fefefe
| 112095 ||  || — || May 9, 2002 || Socorro || LINEAR || — || align=right | 1.3 km || 
|-id=096 bgcolor=#fefefe
| 112096 ||  || — || May 9, 2002 || Socorro || LINEAR || — || align=right | 1.6 km || 
|-id=097 bgcolor=#fefefe
| 112097 ||  || — || May 9, 2002 || Socorro || LINEAR || — || align=right | 1.4 km || 
|-id=098 bgcolor=#fefefe
| 112098 ||  || — || May 9, 2002 || Socorro || LINEAR || FLO || align=right | 1.6 km || 
|-id=099 bgcolor=#fefefe
| 112099 ||  || — || May 9, 2002 || Socorro || LINEAR || NYS || align=right | 2.4 km || 
|-id=100 bgcolor=#E9E9E9
| 112100 ||  || — || May 9, 2002 || Socorro || LINEAR || — || align=right | 3.0 km || 
|}

112101–112200 

|-bgcolor=#fefefe
| 112101 ||  || — || May 9, 2002 || Socorro || LINEAR || — || align=right | 1.3 km || 
|-id=102 bgcolor=#E9E9E9
| 112102 ||  || — || May 9, 2002 || Socorro || LINEAR || — || align=right | 2.0 km || 
|-id=103 bgcolor=#fefefe
| 112103 ||  || — || May 9, 2002 || Socorro || LINEAR || — || align=right | 1.3 km || 
|-id=104 bgcolor=#fefefe
| 112104 ||  || — || May 8, 2002 || Haleakala || NEAT || — || align=right | 1.4 km || 
|-id=105 bgcolor=#fefefe
| 112105 ||  || — || May 8, 2002 || Haleakala || NEAT || FLO || align=right | 1.1 km || 
|-id=106 bgcolor=#fefefe
| 112106 ||  || — || May 9, 2002 || Palomar || NEAT || H || align=right | 1.7 km || 
|-id=107 bgcolor=#d6d6d6
| 112107 ||  || — || May 9, 2002 || Palomar || NEAT || VER || align=right | 5.5 km || 
|-id=108 bgcolor=#fefefe
| 112108 ||  || — || May 9, 2002 || Palomar || NEAT || FLO || align=right | 1.1 km || 
|-id=109 bgcolor=#fefefe
| 112109 ||  || — || May 9, 2002 || Haleakala || NEAT || — || align=right | 2.0 km || 
|-id=110 bgcolor=#fefefe
| 112110 ||  || — || May 10, 2002 || Desert Eagle || W. K. Y. Yeung || — || align=right | 1.5 km || 
|-id=111 bgcolor=#d6d6d6
| 112111 ||  || — || May 8, 2002 || Socorro || LINEAR || — || align=right | 9.2 km || 
|-id=112 bgcolor=#fefefe
| 112112 ||  || — || May 8, 2002 || Socorro || LINEAR || NYS || align=right | 1.2 km || 
|-id=113 bgcolor=#fefefe
| 112113 ||  || — || May 9, 2002 || Socorro || LINEAR || — || align=right | 1.6 km || 
|-id=114 bgcolor=#fefefe
| 112114 ||  || — || May 9, 2002 || Socorro || LINEAR || V || align=right | 1.3 km || 
|-id=115 bgcolor=#fefefe
| 112115 ||  || — || May 9, 2002 || Socorro || LINEAR || ERI || align=right | 2.6 km || 
|-id=116 bgcolor=#fefefe
| 112116 ||  || — || May 9, 2002 || Socorro || LINEAR || V || align=right | 1.3 km || 
|-id=117 bgcolor=#fefefe
| 112117 ||  || — || May 9, 2002 || Socorro || LINEAR || V || align=right | 1.5 km || 
|-id=118 bgcolor=#fefefe
| 112118 ||  || — || May 9, 2002 || Socorro || LINEAR || FLO || align=right | 1.1 km || 
|-id=119 bgcolor=#fefefe
| 112119 ||  || — || May 9, 2002 || Socorro || LINEAR || FLO || align=right | 1.2 km || 
|-id=120 bgcolor=#E9E9E9
| 112120 ||  || — || May 9, 2002 || Socorro || LINEAR || PAE || align=right | 5.5 km || 
|-id=121 bgcolor=#E9E9E9
| 112121 ||  || — || May 9, 2002 || Socorro || LINEAR || — || align=right | 2.5 km || 
|-id=122 bgcolor=#fefefe
| 112122 ||  || — || May 9, 2002 || Socorro || LINEAR || NYS || align=right | 1.5 km || 
|-id=123 bgcolor=#E9E9E9
| 112123 ||  || — || May 9, 2002 || Socorro || LINEAR || — || align=right | 3.2 km || 
|-id=124 bgcolor=#fefefe
| 112124 ||  || — || May 9, 2002 || Socorro || LINEAR || — || align=right | 1.6 km || 
|-id=125 bgcolor=#d6d6d6
| 112125 ||  || — || May 9, 2002 || Socorro || LINEAR || — || align=right | 6.2 km || 
|-id=126 bgcolor=#fefefe
| 112126 ||  || — || May 9, 2002 || Socorro || LINEAR || V || align=right | 1.0 km || 
|-id=127 bgcolor=#FA8072
| 112127 ||  || — || May 9, 2002 || Socorro || LINEAR || — || align=right | 1.2 km || 
|-id=128 bgcolor=#fefefe
| 112128 ||  || — || May 9, 2002 || Socorro || LINEAR || — || align=right | 1.5 km || 
|-id=129 bgcolor=#fefefe
| 112129 ||  || — || May 9, 2002 || Socorro || LINEAR || — || align=right | 1.6 km || 
|-id=130 bgcolor=#fefefe
| 112130 ||  || — || May 9, 2002 || Socorro || LINEAR || — || align=right | 3.2 km || 
|-id=131 bgcolor=#fefefe
| 112131 ||  || — || May 9, 2002 || Socorro || LINEAR || MAS || align=right | 1.4 km || 
|-id=132 bgcolor=#fefefe
| 112132 ||  || — || May 9, 2002 || Socorro || LINEAR || — || align=right | 1.6 km || 
|-id=133 bgcolor=#fefefe
| 112133 ||  || — || May 9, 2002 || Socorro || LINEAR || FLO || align=right | 1.1 km || 
|-id=134 bgcolor=#fefefe
| 112134 ||  || — || May 9, 2002 || Socorro || LINEAR || — || align=right | 1.2 km || 
|-id=135 bgcolor=#fefefe
| 112135 ||  || — || May 9, 2002 || Socorro || LINEAR || MAS || align=right | 1.4 km || 
|-id=136 bgcolor=#fefefe
| 112136 ||  || — || May 9, 2002 || Socorro || LINEAR || V || align=right | 1.2 km || 
|-id=137 bgcolor=#fefefe
| 112137 ||  || — || May 9, 2002 || Socorro || LINEAR || MAS || align=right | 1.4 km || 
|-id=138 bgcolor=#fefefe
| 112138 ||  || — || May 9, 2002 || Socorro || LINEAR || — || align=right | 2.1 km || 
|-id=139 bgcolor=#fefefe
| 112139 ||  || — || May 9, 2002 || Socorro || LINEAR || FLO || align=right | 1.4 km || 
|-id=140 bgcolor=#fefefe
| 112140 ||  || — || May 9, 2002 || Socorro || LINEAR || — || align=right | 1.8 km || 
|-id=141 bgcolor=#fefefe
| 112141 ||  || — || May 9, 2002 || Socorro || LINEAR || — || align=right | 1.8 km || 
|-id=142 bgcolor=#fefefe
| 112142 ||  || — || May 8, 2002 || Socorro || LINEAR || ERI || align=right | 3.5 km || 
|-id=143 bgcolor=#E9E9E9
| 112143 ||  || — || May 8, 2002 || Socorro || LINEAR || — || align=right | 2.0 km || 
|-id=144 bgcolor=#fefefe
| 112144 ||  || — || May 9, 2002 || Socorro || LINEAR || — || align=right | 1.8 km || 
|-id=145 bgcolor=#fefefe
| 112145 ||  || — || May 9, 2002 || Socorro || LINEAR || — || align=right | 1.4 km || 
|-id=146 bgcolor=#fefefe
| 112146 ||  || — || May 9, 2002 || Socorro || LINEAR || — || align=right | 1.5 km || 
|-id=147 bgcolor=#fefefe
| 112147 ||  || — || May 9, 2002 || Socorro || LINEAR || — || align=right | 1.5 km || 
|-id=148 bgcolor=#fefefe
| 112148 ||  || — || May 9, 2002 || Socorro || LINEAR || — || align=right | 1.8 km || 
|-id=149 bgcolor=#fefefe
| 112149 ||  || — || May 10, 2002 || Socorro || LINEAR || — || align=right | 3.8 km || 
|-id=150 bgcolor=#fefefe
| 112150 ||  || — || May 7, 2002 || Socorro || LINEAR || V || align=right | 1.4 km || 
|-id=151 bgcolor=#fefefe
| 112151 ||  || — || May 8, 2002 || Socorro || LINEAR || — || align=right | 1.8 km || 
|-id=152 bgcolor=#fefefe
| 112152 ||  || — || May 8, 2002 || Socorro || LINEAR || NYS || align=right | 2.8 km || 
|-id=153 bgcolor=#fefefe
| 112153 ||  || — || May 8, 2002 || Socorro || LINEAR || — || align=right | 1.7 km || 
|-id=154 bgcolor=#E9E9E9
| 112154 ||  || — || May 8, 2002 || Socorro || LINEAR || — || align=right | 3.9 km || 
|-id=155 bgcolor=#fefefe
| 112155 ||  || — || May 8, 2002 || Socorro || LINEAR || — || align=right | 1.5 km || 
|-id=156 bgcolor=#fefefe
| 112156 ||  || — || May 8, 2002 || Socorro || LINEAR || — || align=right | 1.8 km || 
|-id=157 bgcolor=#fefefe
| 112157 ||  || — || May 9, 2002 || Socorro || LINEAR || NYS || align=right | 1.3 km || 
|-id=158 bgcolor=#E9E9E9
| 112158 ||  || — || May 11, 2002 || Socorro || LINEAR || — || align=right | 1.8 km || 
|-id=159 bgcolor=#fefefe
| 112159 ||  || — || May 11, 2002 || Socorro || LINEAR || — || align=right | 2.0 km || 
|-id=160 bgcolor=#fefefe
| 112160 ||  || — || May 11, 2002 || Socorro || LINEAR || — || align=right | 1.4 km || 
|-id=161 bgcolor=#d6d6d6
| 112161 ||  || — || May 11, 2002 || Socorro || LINEAR || — || align=right | 4.9 km || 
|-id=162 bgcolor=#fefefe
| 112162 ||  || — || May 11, 2002 || Socorro || LINEAR || — || align=right | 1.9 km || 
|-id=163 bgcolor=#fefefe
| 112163 ||  || — || May 11, 2002 || Socorro || LINEAR || — || align=right | 2.1 km || 
|-id=164 bgcolor=#fefefe
| 112164 ||  || — || May 11, 2002 || Socorro || LINEAR || — || align=right | 1.7 km || 
|-id=165 bgcolor=#fefefe
| 112165 ||  || — || May 11, 2002 || Socorro || LINEAR || — || align=right | 2.4 km || 
|-id=166 bgcolor=#E9E9E9
| 112166 ||  || — || May 11, 2002 || Socorro || LINEAR || — || align=right | 1.7 km || 
|-id=167 bgcolor=#fefefe
| 112167 ||  || — || May 11, 2002 || Socorro || LINEAR || — || align=right | 1.2 km || 
|-id=168 bgcolor=#fefefe
| 112168 ||  || — || May 11, 2002 || Socorro || LINEAR || — || align=right | 1.7 km || 
|-id=169 bgcolor=#fefefe
| 112169 ||  || — || May 11, 2002 || Socorro || LINEAR || — || align=right | 1.2 km || 
|-id=170 bgcolor=#fefefe
| 112170 ||  || — || May 11, 2002 || Socorro || LINEAR || FLO || align=right | 1.2 km || 
|-id=171 bgcolor=#fefefe
| 112171 ||  || — || May 11, 2002 || Socorro || LINEAR || — || align=right | 1.4 km || 
|-id=172 bgcolor=#fefefe
| 112172 ||  || — || May 11, 2002 || Socorro || LINEAR || — || align=right | 1.3 km || 
|-id=173 bgcolor=#fefefe
| 112173 ||  || — || May 11, 2002 || Socorro || LINEAR || — || align=right | 1.5 km || 
|-id=174 bgcolor=#fefefe
| 112174 ||  || — || May 11, 2002 || Socorro || LINEAR || — || align=right | 1.6 km || 
|-id=175 bgcolor=#fefefe
| 112175 ||  || — || May 11, 2002 || Socorro || LINEAR || — || align=right | 1.3 km || 
|-id=176 bgcolor=#fefefe
| 112176 ||  || — || May 11, 2002 || Socorro || LINEAR || — || align=right | 1.6 km || 
|-id=177 bgcolor=#fefefe
| 112177 ||  || — || May 11, 2002 || Socorro || LINEAR || FLO || align=right data-sort-value="0.90" | 900 m || 
|-id=178 bgcolor=#E9E9E9
| 112178 ||  || — || May 11, 2002 || Palomar || NEAT || — || align=right | 2.1 km || 
|-id=179 bgcolor=#fefefe
| 112179 ||  || — || May 9, 2002 || Socorro || LINEAR || H || align=right | 1.3 km || 
|-id=180 bgcolor=#E9E9E9
| 112180 ||  || — || May 8, 2002 || Socorro || LINEAR || — || align=right | 2.5 km || 
|-id=181 bgcolor=#E9E9E9
| 112181 ||  || — || May 9, 2002 || Socorro || LINEAR || GEF || align=right | 3.0 km || 
|-id=182 bgcolor=#fefefe
| 112182 ||  || — || May 8, 2002 || Anderson Mesa || LONEOS || FLO || align=right | 1.3 km || 
|-id=183 bgcolor=#fefefe
| 112183 ||  || — || May 12, 2002 || Socorro || LINEAR || — || align=right | 1.8 km || 
|-id=184 bgcolor=#fefefe
| 112184 ||  || — || May 13, 2002 || Socorro || LINEAR || — || align=right | 1.4 km || 
|-id=185 bgcolor=#fefefe
| 112185 ||  || — || May 9, 2002 || Socorro || LINEAR || — || align=right | 1.9 km || 
|-id=186 bgcolor=#fefefe
| 112186 ||  || — || May 9, 2002 || Socorro || LINEAR || — || align=right | 1.8 km || 
|-id=187 bgcolor=#fefefe
| 112187 ||  || — || May 9, 2002 || Socorro || LINEAR || MAS || align=right | 1.2 km || 
|-id=188 bgcolor=#fefefe
| 112188 ||  || — || May 10, 2002 || Socorro || LINEAR || — || align=right | 1.6 km || 
|-id=189 bgcolor=#fefefe
| 112189 ||  || — || May 11, 2002 || Socorro || LINEAR || — || align=right | 2.1 km || 
|-id=190 bgcolor=#fefefe
| 112190 ||  || — || May 12, 2002 || Socorro || LINEAR || — || align=right | 1.4 km || 
|-id=191 bgcolor=#E9E9E9
| 112191 ||  || — || May 12, 2002 || Socorro || LINEAR || — || align=right | 3.1 km || 
|-id=192 bgcolor=#fefefe
| 112192 ||  || — || May 11, 2002 || Palomar || NEAT || V || align=right | 1.2 km || 
|-id=193 bgcolor=#fefefe
| 112193 ||  || — || May 6, 2002 || Socorro || LINEAR || — || align=right | 2.3 km || 
|-id=194 bgcolor=#fefefe
| 112194 ||  || — || May 11, 2002 || Socorro || LINEAR || FLO || align=right data-sort-value="0.95" | 950 m || 
|-id=195 bgcolor=#E9E9E9
| 112195 ||  || — || May 11, 2002 || Socorro || LINEAR || RAF || align=right | 2.5 km || 
|-id=196 bgcolor=#E9E9E9
| 112196 ||  || — || May 11, 2002 || Socorro || LINEAR || — || align=right | 1.9 km || 
|-id=197 bgcolor=#fefefe
| 112197 ||  || — || May 11, 2002 || Socorro || LINEAR || FLO || align=right | 1.6 km || 
|-id=198 bgcolor=#fefefe
| 112198 ||  || — || May 11, 2002 || Socorro || LINEAR || — || align=right | 1.6 km || 
|-id=199 bgcolor=#fefefe
| 112199 ||  || — || May 15, 2002 || Palomar || NEAT || — || align=right | 1.2 km || 
|-id=200 bgcolor=#fefefe
| 112200 ||  || — || May 4, 2002 || Palomar || NEAT || — || align=right | 1.2 km || 
|}

112201–112300 

|-bgcolor=#E9E9E9
| 112201 ||  || — || May 5, 2002 || Palomar || NEAT || MAR || align=right | 2.5 km || 
|-id=202 bgcolor=#fefefe
| 112202 ||  || — || May 5, 2002 || Kitt Peak || Spacewatch || — || align=right | 1.7 km || 
|-id=203 bgcolor=#fefefe
| 112203 ||  || — || May 6, 2002 || Anderson Mesa || LONEOS || V || align=right | 1.3 km || 
|-id=204 bgcolor=#d6d6d6
| 112204 ||  || — || May 6, 2002 || Palomar || NEAT || EOS || align=right | 4.9 km || 
|-id=205 bgcolor=#fefefe
| 112205 ||  || — || May 6, 2002 || Kitt Peak || Spacewatch || — || align=right | 1.9 km || 
|-id=206 bgcolor=#fefefe
| 112206 ||  || — || May 6, 2002 || Kitt Peak || Spacewatch || — || align=right | 1.6 km || 
|-id=207 bgcolor=#E9E9E9
| 112207 ||  || — || May 7, 2002 || Palomar || NEAT || — || align=right | 3.8 km || 
|-id=208 bgcolor=#fefefe
| 112208 ||  || — || May 9, 2002 || Palomar || NEAT || — || align=right | 1.5 km || 
|-id=209 bgcolor=#fefefe
| 112209 ||  || — || May 9, 2002 || Socorro || LINEAR || FLO || align=right | 1.1 km || 
|-id=210 bgcolor=#fefefe
| 112210 ||  || — || May 9, 2002 || Socorro || LINEAR || — || align=right | 1.2 km || 
|-id=211 bgcolor=#fefefe
| 112211 ||  || — || May 9, 2002 || Socorro || LINEAR || MAS || align=right | 1.2 km || 
|-id=212 bgcolor=#fefefe
| 112212 ||  || — || May 9, 2002 || Socorro || LINEAR || FLO || align=right | 1.00 km || 
|-id=213 bgcolor=#fefefe
| 112213 ||  || — || May 9, 2002 || Socorro || LINEAR || FLO || align=right | 1.1 km || 
|-id=214 bgcolor=#fefefe
| 112214 ||  || — || May 9, 2002 || Socorro || LINEAR || FLO || align=right | 1.1 km || 
|-id=215 bgcolor=#fefefe
| 112215 ||  || — || May 10, 2002 || Palomar || NEAT || — || align=right | 1.2 km || 
|-id=216 bgcolor=#fefefe
| 112216 ||  || — || May 10, 2002 || Palomar || NEAT || — || align=right | 1.2 km || 
|-id=217 bgcolor=#E9E9E9
| 112217 ||  || — || May 11, 2002 || Anderson Mesa || LONEOS || — || align=right | 4.7 km || 
|-id=218 bgcolor=#fefefe
| 112218 ||  || — || May 2, 2002 || Haleakala || M. White, M. Collins || — || align=right | 2.0 km || 
|-id=219 bgcolor=#fefefe
| 112219 || 2002 KV || — || May 16, 2002 || Haleakala || NEAT || — || align=right | 1.8 km || 
|-id=220 bgcolor=#E9E9E9
| 112220 ||  || — || May 16, 2002 || Haleakala || NEAT || — || align=right | 4.1 km || 
|-id=221 bgcolor=#FFC2E0
| 112221 ||  || — || May 22, 2002 || Socorro || LINEAR || AMO +1km || align=right | 2.7 km || 
|-id=222 bgcolor=#fefefe
| 112222 ||  || — || May 16, 2002 || Socorro || LINEAR || — || align=right | 1.7 km || 
|-id=223 bgcolor=#fefefe
| 112223 ||  || — || May 23, 2002 || Palomar || NEAT || NYS || align=right | 1.7 km || 
|-id=224 bgcolor=#E9E9E9
| 112224 ||  || — || May 29, 2002 || Haleakala || NEAT || — || align=right | 2.1 km || 
|-id=225 bgcolor=#fefefe
| 112225 ||  || — || May 16, 2002 || Socorro || LINEAR || NYS || align=right | 1.1 km || 
|-id=226 bgcolor=#fefefe
| 112226 ||  || — || May 17, 2002 || Socorro || LINEAR || NYS || align=right data-sort-value="0.93" | 930 m || 
|-id=227 bgcolor=#E9E9E9
| 112227 ||  || — || May 17, 2002 || Kitt Peak || Spacewatch || — || align=right | 3.1 km || 
|-id=228 bgcolor=#E9E9E9
| 112228 ||  || — || May 21, 2002 || Socorro || LINEAR || — || align=right | 1.4 km || 
|-id=229 bgcolor=#fefefe
| 112229 ||  || — || May 21, 2002 || Socorro || LINEAR || — || align=right | 1.6 km || 
|-id=230 bgcolor=#d6d6d6
| 112230 ||  || — || May 27, 2002 || Haleakala || NEAT || LIX || align=right | 9.4 km || 
|-id=231 bgcolor=#E9E9E9
| 112231 ||  || — || May 30, 2002 || Palomar || NEAT || — || align=right | 2.6 km || 
|-id=232 bgcolor=#E9E9E9
| 112232 ||  || — || May 30, 2002 || Palomar || NEAT || — || align=right | 3.2 km || 
|-id=233 bgcolor=#E9E9E9
| 112233 Kammerer ||  ||  || May 16, 2002 || Palomar || M. Meyer || — || align=right | 1.4 km || 
|-id=234 bgcolor=#fefefe
| 112234 || 2002 LB || — || June 1, 2002 || Palomar || NEAT || — || align=right | 1.7 km || 
|-id=235 bgcolor=#fefefe
| 112235 || 2002 LF || — || June 1, 2002 || Palomar || NEAT || — || align=right | 1.7 km || 
|-id=236 bgcolor=#E9E9E9
| 112236 || 2002 LU || — || June 2, 2002 || Socorro || LINEAR || HNS || align=right | 2.4 km || 
|-id=237 bgcolor=#fefefe
| 112237 ||  || — || June 2, 2002 || Palomar || NEAT || — || align=right | 1.4 km || 
|-id=238 bgcolor=#fefefe
| 112238 ||  || — || June 2, 2002 || Palomar || NEAT || — || align=right | 1.7 km || 
|-id=239 bgcolor=#fefefe
| 112239 ||  || — || June 2, 2002 || Palomar || NEAT || — || align=right | 1.2 km || 
|-id=240 bgcolor=#fefefe
| 112240 ||  || — || June 5, 2002 || Socorro || LINEAR || V || align=right | 1.3 km || 
|-id=241 bgcolor=#fefefe
| 112241 ||  || — || June 5, 2002 || Socorro || LINEAR || — || align=right | 1.8 km || 
|-id=242 bgcolor=#fefefe
| 112242 ||  || — || June 5, 2002 || Socorro || LINEAR || FLO || align=right | 1.4 km || 
|-id=243 bgcolor=#fefefe
| 112243 ||  || — || June 5, 2002 || Socorro || LINEAR || — || align=right | 1.8 km || 
|-id=244 bgcolor=#fefefe
| 112244 ||  || — || June 4, 2002 || Palomar || NEAT || — || align=right | 1.6 km || 
|-id=245 bgcolor=#E9E9E9
| 112245 ||  || — || June 6, 2002 || Fountain Hills || C. W. Juels, P. R. Holvorcem || — || align=right | 2.9 km || 
|-id=246 bgcolor=#fefefe
| 112246 ||  || — || June 2, 2002 || Palomar || NEAT || — || align=right | 1.5 km || 
|-id=247 bgcolor=#fefefe
| 112247 ||  || — || June 5, 2002 || Socorro || LINEAR || — || align=right | 1.6 km || 
|-id=248 bgcolor=#E9E9E9
| 112248 ||  || — || June 5, 2002 || Socorro || LINEAR || — || align=right | 5.0 km || 
|-id=249 bgcolor=#fefefe
| 112249 ||  || — || June 5, 2002 || Socorro || LINEAR || FLO || align=right | 1.3 km || 
|-id=250 bgcolor=#fefefe
| 112250 ||  || — || June 5, 2002 || Socorro || LINEAR || FLO || align=right | 1.3 km || 
|-id=251 bgcolor=#fefefe
| 112251 ||  || — || June 5, 2002 || Socorro || LINEAR || — || align=right | 1.5 km || 
|-id=252 bgcolor=#fefefe
| 112252 ||  || — || June 5, 2002 || Socorro || LINEAR || FLO || align=right | 1.4 km || 
|-id=253 bgcolor=#E9E9E9
| 112253 ||  || — || June 5, 2002 || Socorro || LINEAR || — || align=right | 2.2 km || 
|-id=254 bgcolor=#fefefe
| 112254 ||  || — || June 5, 2002 || Socorro || LINEAR || — || align=right | 1.6 km || 
|-id=255 bgcolor=#fefefe
| 112255 ||  || — || June 5, 2002 || Socorro || LINEAR || FLO || align=right | 1.1 km || 
|-id=256 bgcolor=#d6d6d6
| 112256 ||  || — || June 5, 2002 || Socorro || LINEAR || — || align=right | 7.1 km || 
|-id=257 bgcolor=#fefefe
| 112257 ||  || — || June 5, 2002 || Socorro || LINEAR || — || align=right | 1.7 km || 
|-id=258 bgcolor=#E9E9E9
| 112258 ||  || — || June 6, 2002 || Socorro || LINEAR || — || align=right | 2.1 km || 
|-id=259 bgcolor=#fefefe
| 112259 ||  || — || June 6, 2002 || Socorro || LINEAR || NYS || align=right | 1.4 km || 
|-id=260 bgcolor=#fefefe
| 112260 ||  || — || June 6, 2002 || Socorro || LINEAR || — || align=right | 1.5 km || 
|-id=261 bgcolor=#fefefe
| 112261 ||  || — || June 6, 2002 || Socorro || LINEAR || FLO || align=right | 1.4 km || 
|-id=262 bgcolor=#fefefe
| 112262 ||  || — || June 6, 2002 || Socorro || LINEAR || — || align=right | 1.5 km || 
|-id=263 bgcolor=#fefefe
| 112263 ||  || — || June 6, 2002 || Socorro || LINEAR || — || align=right | 1.7 km || 
|-id=264 bgcolor=#fefefe
| 112264 ||  || — || June 6, 2002 || Socorro || LINEAR || — || align=right | 1.8 km || 
|-id=265 bgcolor=#fefefe
| 112265 ||  || — || June 6, 2002 || Socorro || LINEAR || NYS || align=right | 1.4 km || 
|-id=266 bgcolor=#E9E9E9
| 112266 ||  || — || June 6, 2002 || Socorro || LINEAR || — || align=right | 2.5 km || 
|-id=267 bgcolor=#fefefe
| 112267 ||  || — || June 6, 2002 || Socorro || LINEAR || NYS || align=right | 1.4 km || 
|-id=268 bgcolor=#d6d6d6
| 112268 ||  || — || June 6, 2002 || Socorro || LINEAR || MEL || align=right | 12 km || 
|-id=269 bgcolor=#fefefe
| 112269 ||  || — || June 6, 2002 || Socorro || LINEAR || NYS || align=right | 1.6 km || 
|-id=270 bgcolor=#fefefe
| 112270 ||  || — || June 6, 2002 || Socorro || LINEAR || FLO || align=right | 1.4 km || 
|-id=271 bgcolor=#E9E9E9
| 112271 ||  || — || June 6, 2002 || Socorro || LINEAR || — || align=right | 2.3 km || 
|-id=272 bgcolor=#E9E9E9
| 112272 ||  || — || June 8, 2002 || Socorro || LINEAR || — || align=right | 3.9 km || 
|-id=273 bgcolor=#d6d6d6
| 112273 ||  || — || June 8, 2002 || Socorro || LINEAR || — || align=right | 4.4 km || 
|-id=274 bgcolor=#E9E9E9
| 112274 ||  || — || June 8, 2002 || Socorro || LINEAR || — || align=right | 2.0 km || 
|-id=275 bgcolor=#fefefe
| 112275 ||  || — || June 9, 2002 || Desert Eagle || W. K. Y. Yeung || — || align=right | 1.8 km || 
|-id=276 bgcolor=#fefefe
| 112276 ||  || — || June 7, 2002 || Fountain Hills || C. W. Juels, P. R. Holvorcem || — || align=right | 1.9 km || 
|-id=277 bgcolor=#fefefe
| 112277 ||  || — || June 5, 2002 || Socorro || LINEAR || — || align=right | 1.9 km || 
|-id=278 bgcolor=#fefefe
| 112278 ||  || — || June 6, 2002 || Socorro || LINEAR || — || align=right | 1.2 km || 
|-id=279 bgcolor=#fefefe
| 112279 ||  || — || June 6, 2002 || Socorro || LINEAR || NYS || align=right | 1.5 km || 
|-id=280 bgcolor=#fefefe
| 112280 ||  || — || June 9, 2002 || Socorro || LINEAR || — || align=right | 1.4 km || 
|-id=281 bgcolor=#fefefe
| 112281 ||  || — || June 9, 2002 || Socorro || LINEAR || FLO || align=right | 1.5 km || 
|-id=282 bgcolor=#E9E9E9
| 112282 ||  || — || June 9, 2002 || Socorro || LINEAR || — || align=right | 2.0 km || 
|-id=283 bgcolor=#fefefe
| 112283 ||  || — || June 9, 2002 || Socorro || LINEAR || — || align=right | 1.8 km || 
|-id=284 bgcolor=#E9E9E9
| 112284 ||  || — || June 9, 2002 || Socorro || LINEAR || EUN || align=right | 2.5 km || 
|-id=285 bgcolor=#fefefe
| 112285 ||  || — || June 2, 2002 || Palomar || NEAT || FLO || align=right | 1.2 km || 
|-id=286 bgcolor=#E9E9E9
| 112286 ||  || — || June 2, 2002 || Anderson Mesa || LONEOS || — || align=right | 3.5 km || 
|-id=287 bgcolor=#fefefe
| 112287 ||  || — || June 4, 2002 || Palomar || NEAT || FLO || align=right | 1.3 km || 
|-id=288 bgcolor=#fefefe
| 112288 ||  || — || June 10, 2002 || Reedy Creek || J. Broughton || NYS || align=right | 1.5 km || 
|-id=289 bgcolor=#E9E9E9
| 112289 ||  || — || June 9, 2002 || Palomar || NEAT || GER || align=right | 5.0 km || 
|-id=290 bgcolor=#d6d6d6
| 112290 ||  || — || June 3, 2002 || Socorro || LINEAR || TIR || align=right | 5.4 km || 
|-id=291 bgcolor=#fefefe
| 112291 ||  || — || June 5, 2002 || Palomar || NEAT || — || align=right | 1.7 km || 
|-id=292 bgcolor=#fefefe
| 112292 ||  || — || June 12, 2002 || Fountain Hills || C. W. Juels, P. R. Holvorcem || FLO || align=right | 1.4 km || 
|-id=293 bgcolor=#fefefe
| 112293 ||  || — || June 9, 2002 || Socorro || LINEAR || — || align=right | 2.1 km || 
|-id=294 bgcolor=#fefefe
| 112294 ||  || — || June 9, 2002 || Socorro || LINEAR || — || align=right | 1.5 km || 
|-id=295 bgcolor=#fefefe
| 112295 ||  || — || June 9, 2002 || Socorro || LINEAR || — || align=right | 1.6 km || 
|-id=296 bgcolor=#E9E9E9
| 112296 ||  || — || June 12, 2002 || Socorro || LINEAR || — || align=right | 5.4 km || 
|-id=297 bgcolor=#fefefe
| 112297 ||  || — || June 9, 2002 || Socorro || LINEAR || — || align=right | 1.5 km || 
|-id=298 bgcolor=#E9E9E9
| 112298 ||  || — || June 10, 2002 || Socorro || LINEAR || — || align=right | 4.8 km || 
|-id=299 bgcolor=#E9E9E9
| 112299 ||  || — || June 10, 2002 || Socorro || LINEAR || GEF || align=right | 2.1 km || 
|-id=300 bgcolor=#fefefe
| 112300 ||  || — || June 10, 2002 || Socorro || LINEAR || — || align=right | 1.9 km || 
|}

112301–112400 

|-bgcolor=#fefefe
| 112301 ||  || — || June 10, 2002 || Socorro || LINEAR || — || align=right | 1.7 km || 
|-id=302 bgcolor=#fefefe
| 112302 ||  || — || June 9, 2002 || Haleakala || NEAT || — || align=right | 1.3 km || 
|-id=303 bgcolor=#fefefe
| 112303 ||  || — || June 4, 2002 || Palomar || NEAT || V || align=right | 1.2 km || 
|-id=304 bgcolor=#fefefe
| 112304 ||  || — || June 11, 2002 || Socorro || LINEAR || — || align=right | 5.7 km || 
|-id=305 bgcolor=#E9E9E9
| 112305 ||  || — || June 11, 2002 || Socorro || LINEAR || MIT || align=right | 5.2 km || 
|-id=306 bgcolor=#E9E9E9
| 112306 ||  || — || June 12, 2002 || Socorro || LINEAR || MIT || align=right | 3.8 km || 
|-id=307 bgcolor=#E9E9E9
| 112307 ||  || — || June 12, 2002 || Socorro || LINEAR || — || align=right | 3.5 km || 
|-id=308 bgcolor=#fefefe
| 112308 ||  || — || June 12, 2002 || Socorro || LINEAR || CIM || align=right | 4.4 km || 
|-id=309 bgcolor=#d6d6d6
| 112309 ||  || — || June 10, 2002 || Palomar || NEAT || EOS || align=right | 4.5 km || 
|-id=310 bgcolor=#fefefe
| 112310 ||  || — || June 12, 2002 || Palomar || NEAT || NYS || align=right | 3.4 km || 
|-id=311 bgcolor=#fefefe
| 112311 ||  || — || June 9, 2002 || Socorro || LINEAR || — || align=right | 1.7 km || 
|-id=312 bgcolor=#fefefe
| 112312 ||  || — || June 9, 2002 || Socorro || LINEAR || — || align=right | 1.4 km || 
|-id=313 bgcolor=#E9E9E9
| 112313 Larrylines ||  ||  || June 12, 2002 || Needville || J. Dellinger, P. Garossino || RAF || align=right | 1.8 km || 
|-id=314 bgcolor=#fefefe
| 112314 ||  || — || June 9, 2002 || Anderson Mesa || LONEOS || — || align=right | 3.7 km || 
|-id=315 bgcolor=#E9E9E9
| 112315 ||  || — || June 10, 2002 || Socorro || LINEAR || — || align=right | 3.1 km || 
|-id=316 bgcolor=#E9E9E9
| 112316 ||  || — || June 10, 2002 || Socorro || LINEAR || — || align=right | 3.9 km || 
|-id=317 bgcolor=#fefefe
| 112317 ||  || — || June 6, 2002 || Socorro || LINEAR || FLO || align=right | 1.2 km || 
|-id=318 bgcolor=#fefefe
| 112318 ||  || — || June 10, 2002 || Socorro || LINEAR || — || align=right | 1.4 km || 
|-id=319 bgcolor=#E9E9E9
| 112319 || 2002 MM || — || June 17, 2002 || Needville || Needville Obs. || — || align=right | 2.6 km || 
|-id=320 bgcolor=#E9E9E9
| 112320 Danielegardiol ||  ||  || June 19, 2002 || Campo Imperatore || M. Di Martino, F. Bernardi || — || align=right | 4.0 km || 
|-id=321 bgcolor=#fefefe
| 112321 ||  || — || June 16, 2002 || Palomar || NEAT || NYS || align=right | 1.1 km || 
|-id=322 bgcolor=#fefefe
| 112322 ||  || — || June 16, 2002 || Palomar || NEAT || FLO || align=right | 3.1 km || 
|-id=323 bgcolor=#fefefe
| 112323 ||  || — || June 16, 2002 || Palomar || NEAT || — || align=right | 1.7 km || 
|-id=324 bgcolor=#fefefe
| 112324 ||  || — || June 24, 2002 || Haleakala || NEAT || EUTslow || align=right | 1.3 km || 
|-id=325 bgcolor=#E9E9E9
| 112325 ||  || — || June 17, 2002 || Socorro || LINEAR || IAN || align=right | 2.6 km || 
|-id=326 bgcolor=#fefefe
| 112326 ||  || — || June 22, 2002 || La Palma || La Palma Obs. || — || align=right | 1.6 km || 
|-id=327 bgcolor=#fefefe
| 112327 ||  || — || June 26, 2002 || Palomar || NEAT || H || align=right | 1.3 km || 
|-id=328 bgcolor=#fefefe
| 112328 Klinkerfues ||  ||  || June 16, 2002 || Palomar || M. Meyer || MAS || align=right | 1.2 km || 
|-id=329 bgcolor=#d6d6d6
| 112329 || 2002 NY || — || July 5, 2002 || Kitt Peak || Spacewatch || — || align=right | 6.0 km || 
|-id=330 bgcolor=#fefefe
| 112330 ||  || — || July 5, 2002 || Reedy Creek || J. Broughton || — || align=right | 1.3 km || 
|-id=331 bgcolor=#E9E9E9
| 112331 ||  || — || July 4, 2002 || Palomar || NEAT || — || align=right | 2.8 km || 
|-id=332 bgcolor=#E9E9E9
| 112332 ||  || — || July 6, 2002 || Reedy Creek || J. Broughton || — || align=right | 1.9 km || 
|-id=333 bgcolor=#fefefe
| 112333 ||  || — || July 6, 2002 || Needville || Needville Obs. || — || align=right | 1.3 km || 
|-id=334 bgcolor=#fefefe
| 112334 ||  || — || July 1, 2002 || Palomar || NEAT || — || align=right | 1.8 km || 
|-id=335 bgcolor=#fefefe
| 112335 ||  || — || July 1, 2002 || Palomar || NEAT || NYS || align=right | 1.1 km || 
|-id=336 bgcolor=#fefefe
| 112336 ||  || — || July 3, 2002 || Palomar || NEAT || — || align=right | 1.7 km || 
|-id=337 bgcolor=#fefefe
| 112337 Francescaguerra ||  ||  || July 10, 2002 || Campo Imperatore || F. Bernardi || NYS || align=right | 1.0 km || 
|-id=338 bgcolor=#E9E9E9
| 112338 Seneseconte ||  ||  || July 10, 2002 || Campo Imperatore || CINEOS || — || align=right | 1.9 km || 
|-id=339 bgcolor=#d6d6d6
| 112339 ||  || — || July 11, 2002 || Campo Imperatore || CINEOS || — || align=right | 4.0 km || 
|-id=340 bgcolor=#E9E9E9
| 112340 ||  || — || July 11, 2002 || Campo Imperatore || CINEOS || — || align=right | 3.2 km || 
|-id=341 bgcolor=#E9E9E9
| 112341 ||  || — || July 9, 2002 || Palomar || NEAT || — || align=right | 3.0 km || 
|-id=342 bgcolor=#fefefe
| 112342 ||  || — || July 9, 2002 || Palomar || NEAT || — || align=right | 3.4 km || 
|-id=343 bgcolor=#E9E9E9
| 112343 ||  || — || July 9, 2002 || Palomar || NEAT || — || align=right | 3.6 km || 
|-id=344 bgcolor=#fefefe
| 112344 ||  || — || July 1, 2002 || Palomar || NEAT || — || align=right | 1.5 km || 
|-id=345 bgcolor=#fefefe
| 112345 ||  || — || July 1, 2002 || Palomar || NEAT || NYS || align=right | 1.1 km || 
|-id=346 bgcolor=#E9E9E9
| 112346 ||  || — || July 4, 2002 || Kitt Peak || Spacewatch || — || align=right | 3.6 km || 
|-id=347 bgcolor=#d6d6d6
| 112347 ||  || — || July 4, 2002 || Palomar || NEAT || — || align=right | 6.9 km || 
|-id=348 bgcolor=#fefefe
| 112348 ||  || — || July 4, 2002 || Palomar || NEAT || NYS || align=right data-sort-value="0.96" | 960 m || 
|-id=349 bgcolor=#fefefe
| 112349 ||  || — || July 4, 2002 || Palomar || NEAT || MAS || align=right | 1.4 km || 
|-id=350 bgcolor=#fefefe
| 112350 ||  || — || July 4, 2002 || Palomar || NEAT || — || align=right | 4.8 km || 
|-id=351 bgcolor=#fefefe
| 112351 ||  || — || July 4, 2002 || Palomar || NEAT || MAS || align=right | 1.3 km || 
|-id=352 bgcolor=#E9E9E9
| 112352 ||  || — || July 4, 2002 || Palomar || NEAT || — || align=right | 4.1 km || 
|-id=353 bgcolor=#fefefe
| 112353 ||  || — || July 4, 2002 || Palomar || NEAT || NYS || align=right | 1.1 km || 
|-id=354 bgcolor=#fefefe
| 112354 ||  || — || July 4, 2002 || Palomar || NEAT || NYS || align=right | 3.5 km || 
|-id=355 bgcolor=#d6d6d6
| 112355 ||  || — || July 5, 2002 || Socorro || LINEAR || EOS || align=right | 4.9 km || 
|-id=356 bgcolor=#fefefe
| 112356 ||  || — || July 5, 2002 || Socorro || LINEAR || — || align=right | 3.1 km || 
|-id=357 bgcolor=#E9E9E9
| 112357 ||  || — || July 5, 2002 || Socorro || LINEAR || — || align=right | 1.9 km || 
|-id=358 bgcolor=#fefefe
| 112358 ||  || — || July 5, 2002 || Socorro || LINEAR || — || align=right | 1.6 km || 
|-id=359 bgcolor=#E9E9E9
| 112359 ||  || — || July 5, 2002 || Kitt Peak || Spacewatch || — || align=right | 4.2 km || 
|-id=360 bgcolor=#d6d6d6
| 112360 ||  || — || July 9, 2002 || Socorro || LINEAR || — || align=right | 4.1 km || 
|-id=361 bgcolor=#fefefe
| 112361 ||  || — || July 9, 2002 || Socorro || LINEAR || V || align=right | 1.2 km || 
|-id=362 bgcolor=#fefefe
| 112362 ||  || — || July 9, 2002 || Socorro || LINEAR || — || align=right data-sort-value="0.83" | 830 m || 
|-id=363 bgcolor=#fefefe
| 112363 ||  || — || July 9, 2002 || Socorro || LINEAR || FLO || align=right | 1.1 km || 
|-id=364 bgcolor=#E9E9E9
| 112364 ||  || — || July 9, 2002 || Socorro || LINEAR || — || align=right | 2.0 km || 
|-id=365 bgcolor=#fefefe
| 112365 ||  || — || July 9, 2002 || Socorro || LINEAR || V || align=right | 1.3 km || 
|-id=366 bgcolor=#fefefe
| 112366 ||  || — || July 9, 2002 || Socorro || LINEAR || V || align=right | 1.5 km || 
|-id=367 bgcolor=#E9E9E9
| 112367 ||  || — || July 9, 2002 || Socorro || LINEAR || — || align=right | 2.2 km || 
|-id=368 bgcolor=#E9E9E9
| 112368 ||  || — || July 9, 2002 || Socorro || LINEAR || — || align=right | 4.3 km || 
|-id=369 bgcolor=#fefefe
| 112369 ||  || — || July 9, 2002 || Socorro || LINEAR || — || align=right | 4.5 km || 
|-id=370 bgcolor=#fefefe
| 112370 ||  || — || July 9, 2002 || Socorro || LINEAR || V || align=right | 1.1 km || 
|-id=371 bgcolor=#fefefe
| 112371 ||  || — || July 9, 2002 || Socorro || LINEAR || — || align=right | 1.5 km || 
|-id=372 bgcolor=#fefefe
| 112372 ||  || — || July 9, 2002 || Socorro || LINEAR || NYS || align=right | 1.2 km || 
|-id=373 bgcolor=#fefefe
| 112373 ||  || — || July 9, 2002 || Socorro || LINEAR || — || align=right | 1.5 km || 
|-id=374 bgcolor=#fefefe
| 112374 ||  || — || July 9, 2002 || Socorro || LINEAR || — || align=right | 1.8 km || 
|-id=375 bgcolor=#fefefe
| 112375 ||  || — || July 9, 2002 || Socorro || LINEAR || — || align=right | 1.5 km || 
|-id=376 bgcolor=#E9E9E9
| 112376 ||  || — || July 9, 2002 || Socorro || LINEAR || EUN || align=right | 2.5 km || 
|-id=377 bgcolor=#E9E9E9
| 112377 ||  || — || July 9, 2002 || Socorro || LINEAR || — || align=right | 2.4 km || 
|-id=378 bgcolor=#fefefe
| 112378 ||  || — || July 9, 2002 || Socorro || LINEAR || — || align=right | 1.5 km || 
|-id=379 bgcolor=#fefefe
| 112379 ||  || — || July 9, 2002 || Socorro || LINEAR || V || align=right | 1.6 km || 
|-id=380 bgcolor=#FA8072
| 112380 ||  || — || July 9, 2002 || Socorro || LINEAR || — || align=right data-sort-value="0.91" | 910 m || 
|-id=381 bgcolor=#E9E9E9
| 112381 ||  || — || July 9, 2002 || Socorro || LINEAR || ADE || align=right | 2.8 km || 
|-id=382 bgcolor=#d6d6d6
| 112382 ||  || — || July 9, 2002 || Socorro || LINEAR || SAN || align=right | 3.4 km || 
|-id=383 bgcolor=#fefefe
| 112383 ||  || — || July 12, 2002 || Palomar || NEAT || — || align=right | 1.5 km || 
|-id=384 bgcolor=#d6d6d6
| 112384 ||  || — || July 12, 2002 || Palomar || NEAT || — || align=right | 5.5 km || 
|-id=385 bgcolor=#d6d6d6
| 112385 ||  || — || July 13, 2002 || Haleakala || NEAT || THM || align=right | 6.5 km || 
|-id=386 bgcolor=#fefefe
| 112386 ||  || — || July 14, 2002 || Reedy Creek || J. Broughton || — || align=right | 1.6 km || 
|-id=387 bgcolor=#fefefe
| 112387 ||  || — || July 14, 2002 || Reedy Creek || J. Broughton || NYS || align=right | 1.1 km || 
|-id=388 bgcolor=#fefefe
| 112388 ||  || — || July 9, 2002 || Socorro || LINEAR || — || align=right | 3.8 km || 
|-id=389 bgcolor=#fefefe
| 112389 ||  || — || July 15, 2002 || Reedy Creek || J. Broughton || — || align=right | 1.8 km || 
|-id=390 bgcolor=#E9E9E9
| 112390 ||  || — || July 8, 2002 || Palomar || NEAT || HEN || align=right | 1.6 km || 
|-id=391 bgcolor=#d6d6d6
| 112391 ||  || — || July 13, 2002 || Socorro || LINEAR || — || align=right | 7.6 km || 
|-id=392 bgcolor=#fefefe
| 112392 ||  || — || July 13, 2002 || Socorro || LINEAR || — || align=right | 2.3 km || 
|-id=393 bgcolor=#d6d6d6
| 112393 ||  || — || July 13, 2002 || Socorro || LINEAR || — || align=right | 9.7 km || 
|-id=394 bgcolor=#E9E9E9
| 112394 ||  || — || July 13, 2002 || Socorro || LINEAR || EUN || align=right | 2.7 km || 
|-id=395 bgcolor=#E9E9E9
| 112395 ||  || — || July 13, 2002 || Socorro || LINEAR || GEF || align=right | 3.6 km || 
|-id=396 bgcolor=#fefefe
| 112396 ||  || — || July 13, 2002 || Palomar || NEAT || NYS || align=right | 1.1 km || 
|-id=397 bgcolor=#E9E9E9
| 112397 ||  || — || July 9, 2002 || Socorro || LINEAR || RAF || align=right | 1.9 km || 
|-id=398 bgcolor=#fefefe
| 112398 ||  || — || July 9, 2002 || Socorro || LINEAR || V || align=right | 1.1 km || 
|-id=399 bgcolor=#fefefe
| 112399 ||  || — || July 9, 2002 || Socorro || LINEAR || V || align=right | 1.4 km || 
|-id=400 bgcolor=#d6d6d6
| 112400 ||  || — || July 9, 2002 || Socorro || LINEAR || — || align=right | 5.2 km || 
|}

112401–112500 

|-bgcolor=#fefefe
| 112401 ||  || — || July 9, 2002 || Socorro || LINEAR || — || align=right | 1.4 km || 
|-id=402 bgcolor=#d6d6d6
| 112402 ||  || — || July 9, 2002 || Socorro || LINEAR || — || align=right | 4.9 km || 
|-id=403 bgcolor=#E9E9E9
| 112403 ||  || — || July 9, 2002 || Socorro || LINEAR || BRU || align=right | 6.4 km || 
|-id=404 bgcolor=#fefefe
| 112404 ||  || — || July 9, 2002 || Socorro || LINEAR || — || align=right | 1.6 km || 
|-id=405 bgcolor=#E9E9E9
| 112405 ||  || — || July 13, 2002 || Socorro || LINEAR || HNS || align=right | 2.5 km || 
|-id=406 bgcolor=#E9E9E9
| 112406 ||  || — || July 13, 2002 || Socorro || LINEAR || EUN || align=right | 2.6 km || 
|-id=407 bgcolor=#d6d6d6
| 112407 ||  || — || July 14, 2002 || Palomar || NEAT || THM || align=right | 4.8 km || 
|-id=408 bgcolor=#E9E9E9
| 112408 ||  || — || July 14, 2002 || Palomar || NEAT || MAR || align=right | 1.9 km || 
|-id=409 bgcolor=#d6d6d6
| 112409 ||  || — || July 14, 2002 || Palomar || NEAT || KOR || align=right | 2.7 km || 
|-id=410 bgcolor=#d6d6d6
| 112410 ||  || — || July 14, 2002 || Palomar || NEAT || — || align=right | 3.5 km || 
|-id=411 bgcolor=#E9E9E9
| 112411 ||  || — || July 14, 2002 || Palomar || NEAT || — || align=right | 3.2 km || 
|-id=412 bgcolor=#d6d6d6
| 112412 ||  || — || July 14, 2002 || Palomar || NEAT || — || align=right | 5.0 km || 
|-id=413 bgcolor=#fefefe
| 112413 ||  || — || July 15, 2002 || Palomar || NEAT || V || align=right | 1.4 km || 
|-id=414 bgcolor=#fefefe
| 112414 ||  || — || July 15, 2002 || Palomar || NEAT || CLA || align=right | 2.5 km || 
|-id=415 bgcolor=#d6d6d6
| 112415 ||  || — || July 15, 2002 || Palomar || NEAT || — || align=right | 6.2 km || 
|-id=416 bgcolor=#E9E9E9
| 112416 ||  || — || July 15, 2002 || Palomar || NEAT || — || align=right | 3.6 km || 
|-id=417 bgcolor=#fefefe
| 112417 ||  || — || July 15, 2002 || Palomar || NEAT || — || align=right | 1.7 km || 
|-id=418 bgcolor=#fefefe
| 112418 ||  || — || July 12, 2002 || Palomar || NEAT || — || align=right | 1.8 km || 
|-id=419 bgcolor=#fefefe
| 112419 ||  || — || July 13, 2002 || Palomar || NEAT || NYS || align=right | 1.6 km || 
|-id=420 bgcolor=#fefefe
| 112420 ||  || — || July 13, 2002 || Palomar || NEAT || — || align=right | 1.4 km || 
|-id=421 bgcolor=#fefefe
| 112421 ||  || — || July 13, 2002 || Haleakala || NEAT || — || align=right | 1.4 km || 
|-id=422 bgcolor=#fefefe
| 112422 ||  || — || July 13, 2002 || Haleakala || NEAT || — || align=right | 2.2 km || 
|-id=423 bgcolor=#fefefe
| 112423 ||  || — || July 14, 2002 || Palomar || NEAT || — || align=right | 1.9 km || 
|-id=424 bgcolor=#fefefe
| 112424 ||  || — || July 14, 2002 || Socorro || LINEAR || — || align=right | 1.6 km || 
|-id=425 bgcolor=#E9E9E9
| 112425 ||  || — || July 14, 2002 || Socorro || LINEAR || — || align=right | 2.1 km || 
|-id=426 bgcolor=#E9E9E9
| 112426 ||  || — || July 13, 2002 || Haleakala || NEAT || — || align=right | 2.8 km || 
|-id=427 bgcolor=#E9E9E9
| 112427 ||  || — || July 15, 2002 || Palomar || NEAT || — || align=right | 3.2 km || 
|-id=428 bgcolor=#fefefe
| 112428 ||  || — || July 14, 2002 || Socorro || LINEAR || — || align=right | 1.4 km || 
|-id=429 bgcolor=#fefefe
| 112429 ||  || — || July 4, 2002 || Palomar || NEAT || V || align=right | 1.4 km || 
|-id=430 bgcolor=#d6d6d6
| 112430 ||  || — || July 5, 2002 || Socorro || LINEAR || SAN || align=right | 2.9 km || 
|-id=431 bgcolor=#fefefe
| 112431 ||  || — || July 14, 2002 || Palomar || NEAT || NYS || align=right | 1.1 km || 
|-id=432 bgcolor=#d6d6d6
| 112432 ||  || — || July 14, 2002 || Palomar || NEAT || Tj (2.97) || align=right | 6.1 km || 
|-id=433 bgcolor=#d6d6d6
| 112433 ||  || — || July 14, 2002 || Palomar || S. F. Hönig || — || align=right | 5.1 km || 
|-id=434 bgcolor=#E9E9E9
| 112434 || 2002 OD || — || July 16, 2002 || Reedy Creek || J. Broughton || — || align=right | 2.7 km || 
|-id=435 bgcolor=#fefefe
| 112435 || 2002 OO || — || July 17, 2002 || Socorro || LINEAR || — || align=right | 2.4 km || 
|-id=436 bgcolor=#d6d6d6
| 112436 ||  || — || July 17, 2002 || Socorro || LINEAR || — || align=right | 4.8 km || 
|-id=437 bgcolor=#E9E9E9
| 112437 ||  || — || July 17, 2002 || Socorro || LINEAR || — || align=right | 2.8 km || 
|-id=438 bgcolor=#E9E9E9
| 112438 ||  || — || July 17, 2002 || Socorro || LINEAR || — || align=right | 4.1 km || 
|-id=439 bgcolor=#E9E9E9
| 112439 ||  || — || July 17, 2002 || Socorro || LINEAR || GEF || align=right | 3.1 km || 
|-id=440 bgcolor=#fefefe
| 112440 ||  || — || July 17, 2002 || Socorro || LINEAR || PHO || align=right | 2.0 km || 
|-id=441 bgcolor=#d6d6d6
| 112441 ||  || — || July 17, 2002 || Socorro || LINEAR || EOS || align=right | 7.0 km || 
|-id=442 bgcolor=#d6d6d6
| 112442 ||  || — || July 17, 2002 || Socorro || LINEAR || HIL3:2 || align=right | 13 km || 
|-id=443 bgcolor=#d6d6d6
| 112443 ||  || — || July 17, 2002 || Socorro || LINEAR || EOS || align=right | 5.5 km || 
|-id=444 bgcolor=#E9E9E9
| 112444 ||  || — || July 16, 2002 || Reedy Creek || J. Broughton || — || align=right | 2.0 km || 
|-id=445 bgcolor=#E9E9E9
| 112445 ||  || — || July 20, 2002 || Palomar || NEAT || — || align=right | 5.9 km || 
|-id=446 bgcolor=#E9E9E9
| 112446 ||  || — || July 20, 2002 || Palomar || NEAT || JUN || align=right | 4.5 km || 
|-id=447 bgcolor=#E9E9E9
| 112447 ||  || — || July 20, 2002 || Palomar || NEAT || — || align=right | 3.7 km || 
|-id=448 bgcolor=#d6d6d6
| 112448 ||  || — || July 20, 2002 || Palomar || NEAT || — || align=right | 5.8 km || 
|-id=449 bgcolor=#d6d6d6
| 112449 ||  || — || July 18, 2002 || Palomar || NEAT || — || align=right | 6.2 km || 
|-id=450 bgcolor=#fefefe
| 112450 ||  || — || July 18, 2002 || Palomar || NEAT || — || align=right | 1.9 km || 
|-id=451 bgcolor=#fefefe
| 112451 ||  || — || July 21, 2002 || Palomar || NEAT || — || align=right | 1.6 km || 
|-id=452 bgcolor=#d6d6d6
| 112452 ||  || — || July 21, 2002 || Palomar || NEAT || 7:4 || align=right | 5.9 km || 
|-id=453 bgcolor=#d6d6d6
| 112453 ||  || — || July 21, 2002 || Palomar || NEAT || — || align=right | 5.0 km || 
|-id=454 bgcolor=#E9E9E9
| 112454 ||  || — || July 21, 2002 || Palomar || NEAT || — || align=right | 4.5 km || 
|-id=455 bgcolor=#fefefe
| 112455 ||  || — || July 22, 2002 || Palomar || NEAT || MAS || align=right | 1.3 km || 
|-id=456 bgcolor=#E9E9E9
| 112456 ||  || — || July 22, 2002 || Palomar || NEAT || — || align=right | 2.0 km || 
|-id=457 bgcolor=#fefefe
| 112457 ||  || — || July 22, 2002 || Palomar || NEAT || NYS || align=right | 1.4 km || 
|-id=458 bgcolor=#fefefe
| 112458 ||  || — || July 22, 2002 || Palomar || NEAT || — || align=right | 1.5 km || 
|-id=459 bgcolor=#E9E9E9
| 112459 ||  || — || July 16, 2002 || Haleakala || NEAT || DOR || align=right | 4.1 km || 
|-id=460 bgcolor=#E9E9E9
| 112460 ||  || — || July 17, 2002 || Socorro || LINEAR || — || align=right | 5.6 km || 
|-id=461 bgcolor=#d6d6d6
| 112461 ||  || — || July 17, 2002 || Socorro || LINEAR || — || align=right | 6.8 km || 
|-id=462 bgcolor=#E9E9E9
| 112462 ||  || — || July 18, 2002 || Socorro || LINEAR || — || align=right | 3.0 km || 
|-id=463 bgcolor=#d6d6d6
| 112463 ||  || — || July 18, 2002 || Socorro || LINEAR || — || align=right | 5.0 km || 
|-id=464 bgcolor=#FA8072
| 112464 ||  || — || July 18, 2002 || Socorro || LINEAR || — || align=right | 1.2 km || 
|-id=465 bgcolor=#d6d6d6
| 112465 ||  || — || July 18, 2002 || Socorro || LINEAR || — || align=right | 4.8 km || 
|-id=466 bgcolor=#E9E9E9
| 112466 ||  || — || July 18, 2002 || Socorro || LINEAR || EUN || align=right | 2.1 km || 
|-id=467 bgcolor=#E9E9E9
| 112467 ||  || — || July 18, 2002 || Socorro || LINEAR || MAR || align=right | 2.7 km || 
|-id=468 bgcolor=#fefefe
| 112468 ||  || — || July 18, 2002 || Socorro || LINEAR || — || align=right | 1.6 km || 
|-id=469 bgcolor=#fefefe
| 112469 ||  || — || July 18, 2002 || Socorro || LINEAR || V || align=right | 1.1 km || 
|-id=470 bgcolor=#fefefe
| 112470 ||  || — || July 18, 2002 || Socorro || LINEAR || CHL || align=right | 3.5 km || 
|-id=471 bgcolor=#d6d6d6
| 112471 ||  || — || July 18, 2002 || Socorro || LINEAR || — || align=right | 6.0 km || 
|-id=472 bgcolor=#E9E9E9
| 112472 ||  || — || July 20, 2002 || Palomar || NEAT || — || align=right | 2.4 km || 
|-id=473 bgcolor=#d6d6d6
| 112473 ||  || — || July 21, 2002 || Palomar || NEAT || — || align=right | 4.9 km || 
|-id=474 bgcolor=#fefefe
| 112474 ||  || — || July 22, 2002 || Palomar || NEAT || NYS || align=right | 1.7 km || 
|-id=475 bgcolor=#fefefe
| 112475 ||  || — || July 22, 2002 || Palomar || NEAT || — || align=right | 1.5 km || 
|-id=476 bgcolor=#E9E9E9
| 112476 ||  || — || July 30, 2002 || Haleakala || NEAT || EUN || align=right | 2.4 km || 
|-id=477 bgcolor=#E9E9E9
| 112477 ||  || — || July 17, 2002 || Socorro || LINEAR || ADE || align=right | 5.2 km || 
|-id=478 bgcolor=#d6d6d6
| 112478 ||  || — || July 30, 2002 || Haleakala || NEAT || TIR || align=right | 4.3 km || 
|-id=479 bgcolor=#E9E9E9
| 112479 ||  || — || July 29, 2002 || Palomar || S. F. Hönig || — || align=right | 4.4 km || 
|-id=480 bgcolor=#fefefe
| 112480 ||  || — || July 29, 2002 || Palomar || S. F. Hönig || — || align=right | 1.6 km || 
|-id=481 bgcolor=#d6d6d6
| 112481 ||  || — || July 30, 2002 || Haleakala || NEAT || — || align=right | 4.1 km || 
|-id=482 bgcolor=#E9E9E9
| 112482 ||  || — || July 24, 2002 || Palomar || NEAT || GEF || align=right | 2.7 km || 
|-id=483 bgcolor=#E9E9E9
| 112483 Missjudy || 2002 PA ||  || August 1, 2002 || Emerald Lane || L. Ball || — || align=right | 3.5 km || 
|-id=484 bgcolor=#d6d6d6
| 112484 ||  || — || August 4, 2002 || Emerald Lane || L. Ball || — || align=right | 4.3 km || 
|-id=485 bgcolor=#E9E9E9
| 112485 ||  || — || August 4, 2002 || Socorro || LINEAR || — || align=right | 2.5 km || 
|-id=486 bgcolor=#fefefe
| 112486 ||  || — || August 2, 2002 || El Centro || Desert Wanderer Obs. || — || align=right | 1.8 km || 
|-id=487 bgcolor=#E9E9E9
| 112487 ||  || — || August 3, 2002 || Palomar || NEAT || MAR || align=right | 2.0 km || 
|-id=488 bgcolor=#E9E9E9
| 112488 ||  || — || August 3, 2002 || Palomar || NEAT || — || align=right | 5.0 km || 
|-id=489 bgcolor=#E9E9E9
| 112489 ||  || — || August 3, 2002 || Palomar || NEAT || — || align=right | 3.6 km || 
|-id=490 bgcolor=#E9E9E9
| 112490 ||  || — || August 4, 2002 || Palomar || NEAT || — || align=right | 4.2 km || 
|-id=491 bgcolor=#d6d6d6
| 112491 ||  || — || August 4, 2002 || Palomar || NEAT || — || align=right | 3.6 km || 
|-id=492 bgcolor=#E9E9E9
| 112492 Annacipriani ||  ||  || August 2, 2002 || Campo Imperatore || F. Bernardi || — || align=right | 2.7 km || 
|-id=493 bgcolor=#FA8072
| 112493 ||  || — || August 6, 2002 || Palomar || NEAT || — || align=right | 1.7 km || 
|-id=494 bgcolor=#E9E9E9
| 112494 ||  || — || August 5, 2002 || Palomar || NEAT || HOF || align=right | 4.1 km || 
|-id=495 bgcolor=#FA8072
| 112495 ||  || — || August 5, 2002 || Palomar || NEAT || — || align=right | 1.5 km || 
|-id=496 bgcolor=#E9E9E9
| 112496 ||  || — || August 5, 2002 || Palomar || NEAT || EUN || align=right | 2.1 km || 
|-id=497 bgcolor=#d6d6d6
| 112497 ||  || — || August 5, 2002 || Palomar || NEAT || — || align=right | 5.0 km || 
|-id=498 bgcolor=#E9E9E9
| 112498 ||  || — || August 8, 2002 || Farpoint || G. Hug || — || align=right | 3.0 km || 
|-id=499 bgcolor=#fefefe
| 112499 ||  || — || August 6, 2002 || Palomar || NEAT || NYS || align=right | 1.0 km || 
|-id=500 bgcolor=#d6d6d6
| 112500 ||  || — || August 6, 2002 || Palomar || NEAT || — || align=right | 6.4 km || 
|}

112501–112600 

|-bgcolor=#fefefe
| 112501 ||  || — || August 6, 2002 || Palomar || NEAT || — || align=right | 1.0 km || 
|-id=502 bgcolor=#E9E9E9
| 112502 ||  || — || August 6, 2002 || Palomar || NEAT || HEN || align=right | 1.5 km || 
|-id=503 bgcolor=#E9E9E9
| 112503 ||  || — || August 6, 2002 || Palomar || NEAT || — || align=right | 2.9 km || 
|-id=504 bgcolor=#E9E9E9
| 112504 ||  || — || August 6, 2002 || Palomar || NEAT || — || align=right | 1.5 km || 
|-id=505 bgcolor=#E9E9E9
| 112505 ||  || — || August 6, 2002 || Palomar || NEAT || — || align=right | 2.2 km || 
|-id=506 bgcolor=#E9E9E9
| 112506 ||  || — || August 6, 2002 || Palomar || NEAT || MRX || align=right | 1.5 km || 
|-id=507 bgcolor=#d6d6d6
| 112507 ||  || — || August 6, 2002 || Palomar || NEAT || — || align=right | 5.8 km || 
|-id=508 bgcolor=#E9E9E9
| 112508 ||  || — || August 6, 2002 || Palomar || NEAT || — || align=right | 2.5 km || 
|-id=509 bgcolor=#d6d6d6
| 112509 ||  || — || August 6, 2002 || Palomar || NEAT || HYG || align=right | 6.0 km || 
|-id=510 bgcolor=#fefefe
| 112510 ||  || — || August 6, 2002 || Palomar || NEAT || — || align=right | 1.3 km || 
|-id=511 bgcolor=#E9E9E9
| 112511 ||  || — || August 6, 2002 || Palomar || NEAT || — || align=right | 3.1 km || 
|-id=512 bgcolor=#fefefe
| 112512 ||  || — || August 6, 2002 || Palomar || NEAT || NYS || align=right | 1.3 km || 
|-id=513 bgcolor=#fefefe
| 112513 ||  || — || August 6, 2002 || Palomar || NEAT || NYS || align=right | 1.2 km || 
|-id=514 bgcolor=#E9E9E9
| 112514 ||  || — || August 6, 2002 || Palomar || NEAT || WIT || align=right | 1.7 km || 
|-id=515 bgcolor=#fefefe
| 112515 ||  || — || August 6, 2002 || Palomar || NEAT || — || align=right | 1.5 km || 
|-id=516 bgcolor=#d6d6d6
| 112516 ||  || — || August 6, 2002 || Palomar || NEAT || EOSslow || align=right | 4.5 km || 
|-id=517 bgcolor=#E9E9E9
| 112517 ||  || — || August 6, 2002 || Palomar || NEAT || — || align=right | 2.2 km || 
|-id=518 bgcolor=#E9E9E9
| 112518 ||  || — || August 6, 2002 || Palomar || NEAT || — || align=right | 1.8 km || 
|-id=519 bgcolor=#E9E9E9
| 112519 ||  || — || August 6, 2002 || Palomar || NEAT || — || align=right | 4.5 km || 
|-id=520 bgcolor=#d6d6d6
| 112520 ||  || — || August 6, 2002 || Palomar || NEAT || — || align=right | 4.1 km || 
|-id=521 bgcolor=#fefefe
| 112521 ||  || — || August 6, 2002 || Palomar || NEAT || — || align=right | 1.7 km || 
|-id=522 bgcolor=#d6d6d6
| 112522 ||  || — || August 6, 2002 || Palomar || NEAT || — || align=right | 5.2 km || 
|-id=523 bgcolor=#fefefe
| 112523 ||  || — || August 6, 2002 || Palomar || NEAT || NYS || align=right | 1.1 km || 
|-id=524 bgcolor=#fefefe
| 112524 ||  || — || August 6, 2002 || Palomar || NEAT || V || align=right | 1.5 km || 
|-id=525 bgcolor=#d6d6d6
| 112525 ||  || — || August 6, 2002 || Palomar || NEAT || — || align=right | 5.2 km || 
|-id=526 bgcolor=#d6d6d6
| 112526 ||  || — || August 6, 2002 || Palomar || NEAT || — || align=right | 4.1 km || 
|-id=527 bgcolor=#E9E9E9
| 112527 Panarese ||  ||  || August 5, 2002 || Campo Imperatore || CINEOS || AER || align=right | 2.5 km || 
|-id=528 bgcolor=#d6d6d6
| 112528 ||  || — || August 6, 2002 || Palomar || NEAT || THM || align=right | 3.8 km || 
|-id=529 bgcolor=#fefefe
| 112529 ||  || — || August 6, 2002 || Palomar || NEAT || V || align=right | 1.4 km || 
|-id=530 bgcolor=#E9E9E9
| 112530 ||  || — || August 6, 2002 || Palomar || NEAT || NEM || align=right | 3.8 km || 
|-id=531 bgcolor=#E9E9E9
| 112531 ||  || — || August 6, 2002 || Palomar || NEAT || — || align=right | 3.8 km || 
|-id=532 bgcolor=#fefefe
| 112532 ||  || — || August 5, 2002 || Palomar || NEAT || V || align=right | 1.1 km || 
|-id=533 bgcolor=#fefefe
| 112533 ||  || — || August 6, 2002 || Palomar || NEAT || NYS || align=right data-sort-value="0.87" | 870 m || 
|-id=534 bgcolor=#fefefe
| 112534 ||  || — || August 6, 2002 || Palomar || NEAT || — || align=right | 1.5 km || 
|-id=535 bgcolor=#fefefe
| 112535 ||  || — || August 6, 2002 || Palomar || NEAT || MAS || align=right | 1.6 km || 
|-id=536 bgcolor=#d6d6d6
| 112536 ||  || — || August 6, 2002 || Palomar || NEAT || HYG || align=right | 5.0 km || 
|-id=537 bgcolor=#E9E9E9
| 112537 ||  || — || August 7, 2002 || Palomar || NEAT || — || align=right | 2.8 km || 
|-id=538 bgcolor=#d6d6d6
| 112538 ||  || — || August 7, 2002 || Palomar || NEAT || — || align=right | 5.7 km || 
|-id=539 bgcolor=#d6d6d6
| 112539 ||  || — || August 8, 2002 || Emerald Lane || L. Ball || — || align=right | 7.1 km || 
|-id=540 bgcolor=#fefefe
| 112540 ||  || — || August 10, 2002 || Reedy Creek || J. Broughton || NYS || align=right | 2.2 km || 
|-id=541 bgcolor=#fefefe
| 112541 ||  || — || August 8, 2002 || Palomar || NEAT || PHO || align=right | 2.3 km || 
|-id=542 bgcolor=#fefefe
| 112542 ||  || — || August 8, 2002 || Palomar || NEAT || H || align=right | 1.0 km || 
|-id=543 bgcolor=#fefefe
| 112543 ||  || — || August 5, 2002 || Socorro || LINEAR || — || align=right | 1.7 km || 
|-id=544 bgcolor=#fefefe
| 112544 ||  || — || August 5, 2002 || Socorro || LINEAR || — || align=right | 1.6 km || 
|-id=545 bgcolor=#d6d6d6
| 112545 ||  || — || August 5, 2002 || Socorro || LINEAR || — || align=right | 11 km || 
|-id=546 bgcolor=#d6d6d6
| 112546 ||  || — || August 5, 2002 || Socorro || LINEAR || HYG || align=right | 8.7 km || 
|-id=547 bgcolor=#fefefe
| 112547 ||  || — || August 5, 2002 || Socorro || LINEAR || — || align=right | 2.2 km || 
|-id=548 bgcolor=#FA8072
| 112548 ||  || — || August 5, 2002 || Socorro || LINEAR || — || align=right | 1.5 km || 
|-id=549 bgcolor=#fefefe
| 112549 ||  || — || August 11, 2002 || Ametlla de Mar || J. Nomen || — || align=right | 2.0 km || 
|-id=550 bgcolor=#fefefe
| 112550 ||  || — || August 5, 2002 || Socorro || LINEAR || MAS || align=right | 1.7 km || 
|-id=551 bgcolor=#fefefe
| 112551 ||  || — || August 5, 2002 || Socorro || LINEAR || NYS || align=right | 1.6 km || 
|-id=552 bgcolor=#fefefe
| 112552 ||  || — || August 5, 2002 || Socorro || LINEAR || — || align=right | 1.5 km || 
|-id=553 bgcolor=#d6d6d6
| 112553 ||  || — || August 5, 2002 || Socorro || LINEAR || SHU3:2 || align=right | 9.1 km || 
|-id=554 bgcolor=#E9E9E9
| 112554 ||  || — || August 5, 2002 || Socorro || LINEAR || — || align=right | 4.0 km || 
|-id=555 bgcolor=#fefefe
| 112555 ||  || — || August 5, 2002 || Socorro || LINEAR || FLO || align=right | 1.3 km || 
|-id=556 bgcolor=#E9E9E9
| 112556 ||  || — || August 9, 2002 || Socorro || LINEAR || — || align=right | 4.8 km || 
|-id=557 bgcolor=#fefefe
| 112557 ||  || — || August 9, 2002 || Socorro || LINEAR || — || align=right | 1.8 km || 
|-id=558 bgcolor=#fefefe
| 112558 ||  || — || August 9, 2002 || Socorro || LINEAR || — || align=right | 2.0 km || 
|-id=559 bgcolor=#d6d6d6
| 112559 ||  || — || August 10, 2002 || Socorro || LINEAR || EOS || align=right | 3.4 km || 
|-id=560 bgcolor=#d6d6d6
| 112560 ||  || — || August 10, 2002 || Socorro || LINEAR || 629 || align=right | 4.0 km || 
|-id=561 bgcolor=#d6d6d6
| 112561 ||  || — || August 10, 2002 || Socorro || LINEAR || EOS || align=right | 3.7 km || 
|-id=562 bgcolor=#E9E9E9
| 112562 ||  || — || August 10, 2002 || Socorro || LINEAR || — || align=right | 5.5 km || 
|-id=563 bgcolor=#d6d6d6
| 112563 ||  || — || August 10, 2002 || Socorro || LINEAR || — || align=right | 7.0 km || 
|-id=564 bgcolor=#E9E9E9
| 112564 ||  || — || August 10, 2002 || Socorro || LINEAR || — || align=right | 2.3 km || 
|-id=565 bgcolor=#E9E9E9
| 112565 ||  || — || August 10, 2002 || Socorro || LINEAR || — || align=right | 1.6 km || 
|-id=566 bgcolor=#fefefe
| 112566 ||  || — || August 10, 2002 || Socorro || LINEAR || — || align=right | 1.9 km || 
|-id=567 bgcolor=#fefefe
| 112567 ||  || — || August 10, 2002 || Socorro || LINEAR || — || align=right | 1.4 km || 
|-id=568 bgcolor=#E9E9E9
| 112568 ||  || — || August 10, 2002 || Socorro || LINEAR || — || align=right | 1.6 km || 
|-id=569 bgcolor=#E9E9E9
| 112569 ||  || — || August 10, 2002 || Socorro || LINEAR || — || align=right | 4.3 km || 
|-id=570 bgcolor=#E9E9E9
| 112570 ||  || — || August 10, 2002 || Socorro || LINEAR || — || align=right | 2.0 km || 
|-id=571 bgcolor=#E9E9E9
| 112571 ||  || — || August 10, 2002 || Socorro || LINEAR || — || align=right | 3.1 km || 
|-id=572 bgcolor=#d6d6d6
| 112572 ||  || — || August 8, 2002 || Palomar || NEAT || — || align=right | 5.2 km || 
|-id=573 bgcolor=#d6d6d6
| 112573 ||  || — || August 8, 2002 || Palomar || NEAT || HYG || align=right | 4.1 km || 
|-id=574 bgcolor=#fefefe
| 112574 ||  || — || August 8, 2002 || Palomar || NEAT || — || align=right | 2.5 km || 
|-id=575 bgcolor=#fefefe
| 112575 ||  || — || August 8, 2002 || Palomar || NEAT || MAS || align=right | 1.3 km || 
|-id=576 bgcolor=#E9E9E9
| 112576 ||  || — || August 8, 2002 || Palomar || NEAT || — || align=right | 2.5 km || 
|-id=577 bgcolor=#d6d6d6
| 112577 ||  || — || August 8, 2002 || Palomar || NEAT || EOS || align=right | 3.4 km || 
|-id=578 bgcolor=#d6d6d6
| 112578 ||  || — || August 5, 2002 || Socorro || LINEAR || — || align=right | 9.7 km || 
|-id=579 bgcolor=#fefefe
| 112579 ||  || — || August 5, 2002 || Socorro || LINEAR || FLO || align=right | 1.5 km || 
|-id=580 bgcolor=#fefefe
| 112580 ||  || — || August 9, 2002 || Socorro || LINEAR || FLO || align=right | 1.5 km || 
|-id=581 bgcolor=#fefefe
| 112581 ||  || — || August 9, 2002 || Socorro || LINEAR || NYS || align=right | 1.4 km || 
|-id=582 bgcolor=#d6d6d6
| 112582 ||  || — || August 9, 2002 || Socorro || LINEAR || — || align=right | 5.7 km || 
|-id=583 bgcolor=#fefefe
| 112583 ||  || — || August 9, 2002 || Socorro || LINEAR || — || align=right | 1.6 km || 
|-id=584 bgcolor=#d6d6d6
| 112584 ||  || — || August 9, 2002 || Socorro || LINEAR || NAE || align=right | 6.0 km || 
|-id=585 bgcolor=#fefefe
| 112585 ||  || — || August 9, 2002 || Socorro || LINEAR || V || align=right | 2.0 km || 
|-id=586 bgcolor=#d6d6d6
| 112586 ||  || — || August 9, 2002 || Socorro || LINEAR || 3:2 || align=right | 10 km || 
|-id=587 bgcolor=#E9E9E9
| 112587 ||  || — || August 9, 2002 || Socorro || LINEAR || MRX || align=right | 2.0 km || 
|-id=588 bgcolor=#d6d6d6
| 112588 ||  || — || August 9, 2002 || Socorro || LINEAR || — || align=right | 4.6 km || 
|-id=589 bgcolor=#E9E9E9
| 112589 ||  || — || August 9, 2002 || Socorro || LINEAR || — || align=right | 3.1 km || 
|-id=590 bgcolor=#d6d6d6
| 112590 ||  || — || August 9, 2002 || Socorro || LINEAR || EOS || align=right | 4.7 km || 
|-id=591 bgcolor=#E9E9E9
| 112591 ||  || — || August 9, 2002 || Socorro || LINEAR || — || align=right | 5.4 km || 
|-id=592 bgcolor=#fefefe
| 112592 ||  || — || August 9, 2002 || Socorro || LINEAR || — || align=right | 1.7 km || 
|-id=593 bgcolor=#fefefe
| 112593 ||  || — || August 9, 2002 || Socorro || LINEAR || ERI || align=right | 2.9 km || 
|-id=594 bgcolor=#fefefe
| 112594 ||  || — || August 10, 2002 || Socorro || LINEAR || MAS || align=right | 1.7 km || 
|-id=595 bgcolor=#d6d6d6
| 112595 ||  || — || August 10, 2002 || Socorro || LINEAR || — || align=right | 6.7 km || 
|-id=596 bgcolor=#E9E9E9
| 112596 ||  || — || August 10, 2002 || Socorro || LINEAR || — || align=right | 3.5 km || 
|-id=597 bgcolor=#fefefe
| 112597 ||  || — || August 10, 2002 || Socorro || LINEAR || — || align=right | 1.5 km || 
|-id=598 bgcolor=#fefefe
| 112598 ||  || — || August 10, 2002 || Socorro || LINEAR || — || align=right | 1.6 km || 
|-id=599 bgcolor=#E9E9E9
| 112599 ||  || — || August 10, 2002 || Socorro || LINEAR || — || align=right | 3.8 km || 
|-id=600 bgcolor=#E9E9E9
| 112600 ||  || — || August 10, 2002 || Socorro || LINEAR || — || align=right | 3.0 km || 
|}

112601–112700 

|-bgcolor=#fefefe
| 112601 ||  || — || August 10, 2002 || Socorro || LINEAR || — || align=right | 2.0 km || 
|-id=602 bgcolor=#E9E9E9
| 112602 ||  || — || August 10, 2002 || Socorro || LINEAR || ADE || align=right | 4.6 km || 
|-id=603 bgcolor=#fefefe
| 112603 ||  || — || August 10, 2002 || Socorro || LINEAR || — || align=right | 1.6 km || 
|-id=604 bgcolor=#fefefe
| 112604 ||  || — || August 10, 2002 || Socorro || LINEAR || NYS || align=right | 1.5 km || 
|-id=605 bgcolor=#fefefe
| 112605 ||  || — || August 10, 2002 || Socorro || LINEAR || — || align=right | 2.0 km || 
|-id=606 bgcolor=#fefefe
| 112606 ||  || — || August 11, 2002 || Socorro || LINEAR || — || align=right | 1.6 km || 
|-id=607 bgcolor=#E9E9E9
| 112607 ||  || — || August 8, 2002 || Palomar || NEAT || NEM || align=right | 3.6 km || 
|-id=608 bgcolor=#E9E9E9
| 112608 ||  || — || August 8, 2002 || Palomar || NEAT || — || align=right | 2.5 km || 
|-id=609 bgcolor=#fefefe
| 112609 ||  || — || August 8, 2002 || Palomar || NEAT || — || align=right | 2.1 km || 
|-id=610 bgcolor=#E9E9E9
| 112610 ||  || — || August 3, 2002 || Palomar || NEAT || — || align=right | 1.9 km || 
|-id=611 bgcolor=#fefefe
| 112611 ||  || — || August 3, 2002 || Palomar || NEAT || FLO || align=right data-sort-value="0.99" | 990 m || 
|-id=612 bgcolor=#d6d6d6
| 112612 ||  || — || August 4, 2002 || Palomar || NEAT || — || align=right | 7.0 km || 
|-id=613 bgcolor=#E9E9E9
| 112613 ||  || — || August 4, 2002 || Palomar || NEAT || MAR || align=right | 2.0 km || 
|-id=614 bgcolor=#E9E9E9
| 112614 ||  || — || August 6, 2002 || Palomar || NEAT || — || align=right | 3.7 km || 
|-id=615 bgcolor=#fefefe
| 112615 ||  || — || August 6, 2002 || Palomar || NEAT || — || align=right | 1.4 km || 
|-id=616 bgcolor=#E9E9E9
| 112616 ||  || — || August 6, 2002 || Palomar || NEAT || — || align=right | 2.7 km || 
|-id=617 bgcolor=#fefefe
| 112617 ||  || — || August 11, 2002 || Socorro || LINEAR || — || align=right | 4.9 km || 
|-id=618 bgcolor=#fefefe
| 112618 ||  || — || August 11, 2002 || Socorro || LINEAR || — || align=right | 4.5 km || 
|-id=619 bgcolor=#d6d6d6
| 112619 ||  || — || August 11, 2002 || Socorro || LINEAR || — || align=right | 5.7 km || 
|-id=620 bgcolor=#E9E9E9
| 112620 ||  || — || August 11, 2002 || Socorro || LINEAR || — || align=right | 4.3 km || 
|-id=621 bgcolor=#E9E9E9
| 112621 ||  || — || August 11, 2002 || Socorro || LINEAR || GEF || align=right | 3.4 km || 
|-id=622 bgcolor=#d6d6d6
| 112622 ||  || — || August 11, 2002 || Socorro || LINEAR || — || align=right | 6.3 km || 
|-id=623 bgcolor=#d6d6d6
| 112623 ||  || — || August 11, 2002 || Socorro || LINEAR || — || align=right | 3.8 km || 
|-id=624 bgcolor=#E9E9E9
| 112624 ||  || — || August 12, 2002 || Socorro || LINEAR || — || align=right | 2.3 km || 
|-id=625 bgcolor=#E9E9E9
| 112625 ||  || — || August 12, 2002 || Socorro || LINEAR || — || align=right | 1.8 km || 
|-id=626 bgcolor=#d6d6d6
| 112626 ||  || — || August 12, 2002 || Socorro || LINEAR || — || align=right | 9.7 km || 
|-id=627 bgcolor=#E9E9E9
| 112627 ||  || — || August 8, 2002 || Palomar || NEAT || — || align=right | 3.0 km || 
|-id=628 bgcolor=#E9E9E9
| 112628 ||  || — || August 8, 2002 || Palomar || NEAT || — || align=right | 2.9 km || 
|-id=629 bgcolor=#d6d6d6
| 112629 ||  || — || August 11, 2002 || Palomar || NEAT || — || align=right | 3.4 km || 
|-id=630 bgcolor=#d6d6d6
| 112630 ||  || — || August 11, 2002 || Palomar || NEAT || EOS || align=right | 3.5 km || 
|-id=631 bgcolor=#d6d6d6
| 112631 ||  || — || August 11, 2002 || Haleakala || NEAT || SAN || align=right | 3.1 km || 
|-id=632 bgcolor=#E9E9E9
| 112632 ||  || — || August 11, 2002 || Palomar || NEAT || — || align=right | 1.7 km || 
|-id=633 bgcolor=#E9E9E9
| 112633 ||  || — || August 11, 2002 || Palomar || NEAT || — || align=right | 1.8 km || 
|-id=634 bgcolor=#E9E9E9
| 112634 ||  || — || August 11, 2002 || Palomar || NEAT || — || align=right | 2.3 km || 
|-id=635 bgcolor=#fefefe
| 112635 ||  || — || August 11, 2002 || Palomar || NEAT || V || align=right | 1.5 km || 
|-id=636 bgcolor=#fefefe
| 112636 ||  || — || August 11, 2002 || Palomar || NEAT || V || align=right | 1.3 km || 
|-id=637 bgcolor=#E9E9E9
| 112637 ||  || — || August 6, 2002 || Kvistaberg || UDAS || — || align=right | 4.1 km || 
|-id=638 bgcolor=#fefefe
| 112638 ||  || — || August 9, 2002 || Socorro || LINEAR || V || align=right | 1.4 km || 
|-id=639 bgcolor=#fefefe
| 112639 ||  || — || August 9, 2002 || Socorro || LINEAR || NYS || align=right | 1.5 km || 
|-id=640 bgcolor=#fefefe
| 112640 ||  || — || August 9, 2002 || Socorro || LINEAR || NYS || align=right | 1.3 km || 
|-id=641 bgcolor=#fefefe
| 112641 ||  || — || August 9, 2002 || Socorro || LINEAR || NYS || align=right | 1.5 km || 
|-id=642 bgcolor=#E9E9E9
| 112642 ||  || — || August 9, 2002 || Socorro || LINEAR || EUN || align=right | 2.5 km || 
|-id=643 bgcolor=#E9E9E9
| 112643 ||  || — || August 10, 2002 || Socorro || LINEAR || — || align=right | 1.7 km || 
|-id=644 bgcolor=#fefefe
| 112644 ||  || — || August 10, 2002 || Socorro || LINEAR || MAS || align=right | 1.1 km || 
|-id=645 bgcolor=#fefefe
| 112645 ||  || — || August 10, 2002 || Socorro || LINEAR || — || align=right | 1.8 km || 
|-id=646 bgcolor=#fefefe
| 112646 ||  || — || August 10, 2002 || Socorro || LINEAR || NYS || align=right | 1.5 km || 
|-id=647 bgcolor=#d6d6d6
| 112647 ||  || — || August 10, 2002 || Socorro || LINEAR || KOR || align=right | 3.6 km || 
|-id=648 bgcolor=#fefefe
| 112648 ||  || — || August 10, 2002 || Socorro || LINEAR || NYS || align=right | 1.4 km || 
|-id=649 bgcolor=#E9E9E9
| 112649 ||  || — || August 10, 2002 || Socorro || LINEAR || — || align=right | 4.3 km || 
|-id=650 bgcolor=#E9E9E9
| 112650 ||  || — || August 10, 2002 || Socorro || LINEAR || — || align=right | 2.7 km || 
|-id=651 bgcolor=#d6d6d6
| 112651 ||  || — || August 10, 2002 || Socorro || LINEAR || — || align=right | 6.4 km || 
|-id=652 bgcolor=#E9E9E9
| 112652 ||  || — || August 10, 2002 || Socorro || LINEAR || — || align=right | 2.0 km || 
|-id=653 bgcolor=#d6d6d6
| 112653 ||  || — || August 10, 2002 || Socorro || LINEAR || EOS || align=right | 3.8 km || 
|-id=654 bgcolor=#fefefe
| 112654 ||  || — || August 10, 2002 || Socorro || LINEAR || NYS || align=right | 1.4 km || 
|-id=655 bgcolor=#fefefe
| 112655 ||  || — || August 12, 2002 || Socorro || LINEAR || MAS || align=right | 1.5 km || 
|-id=656 bgcolor=#E9E9E9
| 112656 Gines ||  ||  || August 12, 2002 || Pla D'Arguines || R. Ferrando || — || align=right | 2.7 km || 
|-id=657 bgcolor=#fefefe
| 112657 ||  || — || August 13, 2002 || El Centro || W. K. Y. Yeung || NYS || align=right | 1.5 km || 
|-id=658 bgcolor=#fefefe
| 112658 ||  || — || August 13, 2002 || Fountain Hills || C. W. Juels, P. R. Holvorcem || NYS || align=right | 1.7 km || 
|-id=659 bgcolor=#E9E9E9
| 112659 ||  || — || August 13, 2002 || Tenagra || Tenagra Obs. || — || align=right | 2.9 km || 
|-id=660 bgcolor=#d6d6d6
| 112660 ||  || — || August 14, 2002 || Reedy Creek || J. Broughton || LIX || align=right | 8.0 km || 
|-id=661 bgcolor=#FA8072
| 112661 ||  || — || August 14, 2002 || Socorro || LINEAR || — || align=right | 1.4 km || 
|-id=662 bgcolor=#fefefe
| 112662 ||  || — || August 12, 2002 || Socorro || LINEAR || NYS || align=right | 1.3 km || 
|-id=663 bgcolor=#d6d6d6
| 112663 ||  || — || August 12, 2002 || Socorro || LINEAR || — || align=right | 4.4 km || 
|-id=664 bgcolor=#E9E9E9
| 112664 ||  || — || August 11, 2002 || Socorro || LINEAR || — || align=right | 2.7 km || 
|-id=665 bgcolor=#E9E9E9
| 112665 ||  || — || August 11, 2002 || Socorro || LINEAR || — || align=right | 3.4 km || 
|-id=666 bgcolor=#fefefe
| 112666 ||  || — || August 13, 2002 || Socorro || LINEAR || — || align=right | 2.3 km || 
|-id=667 bgcolor=#fefefe
| 112667 ||  || — || August 14, 2002 || Socorro || LINEAR || — || align=right | 2.2 km || 
|-id=668 bgcolor=#E9E9E9
| 112668 ||  || — || August 14, 2002 || Socorro || LINEAR || HNS || align=right | 2.5 km || 
|-id=669 bgcolor=#d6d6d6
| 112669 ||  || — || August 14, 2002 || Socorro || LINEAR || URS || align=right | 6.6 km || 
|-id=670 bgcolor=#fefefe
| 112670 ||  || — || August 11, 2002 || Haleakala || NEAT || NYS || align=right data-sort-value="0.84" | 840 m || 
|-id=671 bgcolor=#E9E9E9
| 112671 ||  || — || August 12, 2002 || Haleakala || NEAT || — || align=right | 2.2 km || 
|-id=672 bgcolor=#d6d6d6
| 112672 ||  || — || August 12, 2002 || Haleakala || NEAT || HYG || align=right | 5.8 km || 
|-id=673 bgcolor=#fefefe
| 112673 ||  || — || August 12, 2002 || Haleakala || NEAT || V || align=right | 1.3 km || 
|-id=674 bgcolor=#fefefe
| 112674 ||  || — || August 13, 2002 || Palomar || NEAT || — || align=right | 1.4 km || 
|-id=675 bgcolor=#E9E9E9
| 112675 ||  || — || August 14, 2002 || Socorro || LINEAR || — || align=right | 4.6 km || 
|-id=676 bgcolor=#E9E9E9
| 112676 ||  || — || August 14, 2002 || Socorro || LINEAR || — || align=right | 2.3 km || 
|-id=677 bgcolor=#fefefe
| 112677 ||  || — || August 14, 2002 || Socorro || LINEAR || — || align=right | 1.6 km || 
|-id=678 bgcolor=#E9E9E9
| 112678 ||  || — || August 14, 2002 || Socorro || LINEAR || HOF || align=right | 3.8 km || 
|-id=679 bgcolor=#E9E9E9
| 112679 ||  || — || August 14, 2002 || Socorro || LINEAR || MIS || align=right | 4.4 km || 
|-id=680 bgcolor=#fefefe
| 112680 ||  || — || August 14, 2002 || Socorro || LINEAR || NYS || align=right | 1.0 km || 
|-id=681 bgcolor=#d6d6d6
| 112681 ||  || — || August 14, 2002 || Socorro || LINEAR || HYG || align=right | 5.6 km || 
|-id=682 bgcolor=#fefefe
| 112682 ||  || — || August 14, 2002 || Socorro || LINEAR || V || align=right | 1.8 km || 
|-id=683 bgcolor=#fefefe
| 112683 ||  || — || August 14, 2002 || Socorro || LINEAR || — || align=right | 2.2 km || 
|-id=684 bgcolor=#d6d6d6
| 112684 ||  || — || August 14, 2002 || Socorro || LINEAR || — || align=right | 5.8 km || 
|-id=685 bgcolor=#fefefe
| 112685 ||  || — || August 14, 2002 || Socorro || LINEAR || V || align=right | 1.3 km || 
|-id=686 bgcolor=#E9E9E9
| 112686 ||  || — || August 14, 2002 || Socorro || LINEAR || — || align=right | 1.8 km || 
|-id=687 bgcolor=#fefefe
| 112687 ||  || — || August 14, 2002 || Socorro || LINEAR || — || align=right | 1.7 km || 
|-id=688 bgcolor=#fefefe
| 112688 ||  || — || August 14, 2002 || Socorro || LINEAR || — || align=right | 1.7 km || 
|-id=689 bgcolor=#fefefe
| 112689 ||  || — || August 14, 2002 || Socorro || LINEAR || — || align=right | 1.9 km || 
|-id=690 bgcolor=#d6d6d6
| 112690 ||  || — || August 14, 2002 || Socorro || LINEAR || — || align=right | 7.9 km || 
|-id=691 bgcolor=#E9E9E9
| 112691 ||  || — || August 14, 2002 || Socorro || LINEAR || — || align=right | 5.9 km || 
|-id=692 bgcolor=#fefefe
| 112692 ||  || — || August 11, 2002 || Palomar || NEAT || — || align=right | 1.2 km || 
|-id=693 bgcolor=#fefefe
| 112693 ||  || — || August 12, 2002 || Socorro || LINEAR || — || align=right | 1.5 km || 
|-id=694 bgcolor=#d6d6d6
| 112694 ||  || — || August 12, 2002 || Socorro || LINEAR || 3:2 || align=right | 8.1 km || 
|-id=695 bgcolor=#E9E9E9
| 112695 ||  || — || August 12, 2002 || Socorro || LINEAR || GEF || align=right | 2.1 km || 
|-id=696 bgcolor=#fefefe
| 112696 ||  || — || August 12, 2002 || Socorro || LINEAR || V || align=right | 1.2 km || 
|-id=697 bgcolor=#fefefe
| 112697 ||  || — || August 12, 2002 || Socorro || LINEAR || — || align=right | 1.7 km || 
|-id=698 bgcolor=#d6d6d6
| 112698 ||  || — || August 12, 2002 || Socorro || LINEAR || EOS || align=right | 3.9 km || 
|-id=699 bgcolor=#d6d6d6
| 112699 ||  || — || August 12, 2002 || Socorro || LINEAR || — || align=right | 5.7 km || 
|-id=700 bgcolor=#fefefe
| 112700 ||  || — || August 12, 2002 || Socorro || LINEAR || KLI || align=right | 3.8 km || 
|}

112701–112800 

|-bgcolor=#d6d6d6
| 112701 ||  || — || August 12, 2002 || Socorro || LINEAR || EOS || align=right | 3.5 km || 
|-id=702 bgcolor=#fefefe
| 112702 ||  || — || August 12, 2002 || Socorro || LINEAR || V || align=right data-sort-value="0.82" | 820 m || 
|-id=703 bgcolor=#d6d6d6
| 112703 ||  || — || August 12, 2002 || Socorro || LINEAR || EOS || align=right | 6.2 km || 
|-id=704 bgcolor=#fefefe
| 112704 ||  || — || August 12, 2002 || Socorro || LINEAR || — || align=right | 1.6 km || 
|-id=705 bgcolor=#fefefe
| 112705 ||  || — || August 13, 2002 || Socorro || LINEAR || NYS || align=right data-sort-value="0.96" | 960 m || 
|-id=706 bgcolor=#fefefe
| 112706 ||  || — || August 13, 2002 || Socorro || LINEAR || FLO || align=right | 1.2 km || 
|-id=707 bgcolor=#d6d6d6
| 112707 ||  || — || August 13, 2002 || Socorro || LINEAR || — || align=right | 4.6 km || 
|-id=708 bgcolor=#d6d6d6
| 112708 ||  || — || August 13, 2002 || Socorro || LINEAR || EOS || align=right | 3.6 km || 
|-id=709 bgcolor=#fefefe
| 112709 ||  || — || August 13, 2002 || Anderson Mesa || LONEOS || — || align=right | 1.2 km || 
|-id=710 bgcolor=#E9E9E9
| 112710 ||  || — || August 13, 2002 || Socorro || LINEAR || — || align=right | 2.0 km || 
|-id=711 bgcolor=#d6d6d6
| 112711 ||  || — || August 13, 2002 || Socorro || LINEAR || FIR || align=right | 6.7 km || 
|-id=712 bgcolor=#fefefe
| 112712 ||  || — || August 14, 2002 || Socorro || LINEAR || — || align=right | 1.5 km || 
|-id=713 bgcolor=#E9E9E9
| 112713 ||  || — || August 14, 2002 || Socorro || LINEAR || — || align=right | 4.0 km || 
|-id=714 bgcolor=#E9E9E9
| 112714 ||  || — || August 14, 2002 || Socorro || LINEAR || — || align=right | 2.4 km || 
|-id=715 bgcolor=#E9E9E9
| 112715 ||  || — || August 12, 2002 || Socorro || LINEAR || — || align=right | 3.6 km || 
|-id=716 bgcolor=#E9E9E9
| 112716 ||  || — || August 12, 2002 || Haleakala || NEAT || — || align=right | 4.7 km || 
|-id=717 bgcolor=#d6d6d6
| 112717 ||  || — || August 13, 2002 || Socorro || LINEAR || — || align=right | 6.9 km || 
|-id=718 bgcolor=#fefefe
| 112718 ||  || — || August 14, 2002 || Socorro || LINEAR || — || align=right | 1.5 km || 
|-id=719 bgcolor=#E9E9E9
| 112719 ||  || — || August 14, 2002 || Anderson Mesa || LONEOS || — || align=right | 3.2 km || 
|-id=720 bgcolor=#d6d6d6
| 112720 ||  || — || August 14, 2002 || Anderson Mesa || LONEOS || — || align=right | 6.8 km || 
|-id=721 bgcolor=#fefefe
| 112721 ||  || — || August 13, 2002 || Palomar || NEAT || V || align=right | 1.3 km || 
|-id=722 bgcolor=#E9E9E9
| 112722 ||  || — || August 13, 2002 || Anderson Mesa || LONEOS || — || align=right | 4.6 km || 
|-id=723 bgcolor=#fefefe
| 112723 ||  || — || August 13, 2002 || Anderson Mesa || LONEOS || — || align=right | 1.3 km || 
|-id=724 bgcolor=#d6d6d6
| 112724 ||  || — || August 13, 2002 || Anderson Mesa || LONEOS || — || align=right | 5.6 km || 
|-id=725 bgcolor=#d6d6d6
| 112725 ||  || — || August 13, 2002 || Anderson Mesa || LONEOS || — || align=right | 6.8 km || 
|-id=726 bgcolor=#d6d6d6
| 112726 ||  || — || August 13, 2002 || Anderson Mesa || LONEOS || HYG || align=right | 6.2 km || 
|-id=727 bgcolor=#d6d6d6
| 112727 ||  || — || August 13, 2002 || Anderson Mesa || LONEOS || EOS || align=right | 4.5 km || 
|-id=728 bgcolor=#d6d6d6
| 112728 ||  || — || August 13, 2002 || Anderson Mesa || LONEOS || — || align=right | 4.6 km || 
|-id=729 bgcolor=#E9E9E9
| 112729 ||  || — || August 14, 2002 || Socorro || LINEAR || — || align=right | 1.6 km || 
|-id=730 bgcolor=#d6d6d6
| 112730 ||  || — || August 13, 2002 || Anderson Mesa || LONEOS || — || align=right | 5.5 km || 
|-id=731 bgcolor=#fefefe
| 112731 ||  || — || August 14, 2002 || Socorro || LINEAR || MAS || align=right | 1.4 km || 
|-id=732 bgcolor=#d6d6d6
| 112732 ||  || — || August 14, 2002 || Socorro || LINEAR || — || align=right | 4.6 km || 
|-id=733 bgcolor=#fefefe
| 112733 ||  || — || August 14, 2002 || Socorro || LINEAR || — || align=right | 1.5 km || 
|-id=734 bgcolor=#fefefe
| 112734 ||  || — || August 14, 2002 || Socorro || LINEAR || MAS || align=right | 1.5 km || 
|-id=735 bgcolor=#E9E9E9
| 112735 ||  || — || August 14, 2002 || Socorro || LINEAR || DOR || align=right | 4.8 km || 
|-id=736 bgcolor=#fefefe
| 112736 ||  || — || August 14, 2002 || Socorro || LINEAR || FLO || align=right | 1.3 km || 
|-id=737 bgcolor=#E9E9E9
| 112737 ||  || — || August 14, 2002 || Socorro || LINEAR || — || align=right | 3.0 km || 
|-id=738 bgcolor=#fefefe
| 112738 ||  || — || August 14, 2002 || Socorro || LINEAR || — || align=right | 2.2 km || 
|-id=739 bgcolor=#d6d6d6
| 112739 ||  || — || August 14, 2002 || Socorro || LINEAR || — || align=right | 6.7 km || 
|-id=740 bgcolor=#d6d6d6
| 112740 ||  || — || August 14, 2002 || Socorro || LINEAR || ALA || align=right | 9.2 km || 
|-id=741 bgcolor=#E9E9E9
| 112741 ||  || — || August 15, 2002 || Palomar || NEAT || — || align=right | 3.9 km || 
|-id=742 bgcolor=#E9E9E9
| 112742 ||  || — || August 13, 2002 || Socorro || LINEAR || — || align=right | 4.5 km || 
|-id=743 bgcolor=#E9E9E9
| 112743 ||  || — || August 13, 2002 || Anderson Mesa || LONEOS || — || align=right | 3.6 km || 
|-id=744 bgcolor=#fefefe
| 112744 ||  || — || August 14, 2002 || Socorro || LINEAR || MAS || align=right | 2.0 km || 
|-id=745 bgcolor=#d6d6d6
| 112745 ||  || — || August 14, 2002 || Socorro || LINEAR || — || align=right | 4.7 km || 
|-id=746 bgcolor=#fefefe
| 112746 ||  || — || August 14, 2002 || Socorro || LINEAR || NYS || align=right | 1.4 km || 
|-id=747 bgcolor=#d6d6d6
| 112747 ||  || — || August 14, 2002 || Socorro || LINEAR || VER || align=right | 7.2 km || 
|-id=748 bgcolor=#d6d6d6
| 112748 ||  || — || August 14, 2002 || Socorro || LINEAR || — || align=right | 5.9 km || 
|-id=749 bgcolor=#d6d6d6
| 112749 ||  || — || August 14, 2002 || Socorro || LINEAR || — || align=right | 5.9 km || 
|-id=750 bgcolor=#fefefe
| 112750 ||  || — || August 14, 2002 || Socorro || LINEAR || — || align=right | 1.5 km || 
|-id=751 bgcolor=#fefefe
| 112751 ||  || — || August 14, 2002 || Socorro || LINEAR || — || align=right | 1.3 km || 
|-id=752 bgcolor=#fefefe
| 112752 ||  || — || August 14, 2002 || Socorro || LINEAR || V || align=right | 1.3 km || 
|-id=753 bgcolor=#fefefe
| 112753 ||  || — || August 14, 2002 || Socorro || LINEAR || — || align=right | 1.2 km || 
|-id=754 bgcolor=#fefefe
| 112754 ||  || — || August 14, 2002 || Socorro || LINEAR || NYS || align=right | 1.2 km || 
|-id=755 bgcolor=#E9E9E9
| 112755 ||  || — || August 14, 2002 || Socorro || LINEAR || — || align=right | 4.3 km || 
|-id=756 bgcolor=#d6d6d6
| 112756 ||  || — || August 14, 2002 || Socorro || LINEAR || KOR || align=right | 2.5 km || 
|-id=757 bgcolor=#d6d6d6
| 112757 ||  || — || August 14, 2002 || Socorro || LINEAR || EOS || align=right | 3.9 km || 
|-id=758 bgcolor=#E9E9E9
| 112758 ||  || — || August 14, 2002 || Socorro || LINEAR || — || align=right | 2.0 km || 
|-id=759 bgcolor=#fefefe
| 112759 ||  || — || August 15, 2002 || Socorro || LINEAR || — || align=right | 1.6 km || 
|-id=760 bgcolor=#d6d6d6
| 112760 ||  || — || August 13, 2002 || Bergisch Gladbach || W. Bickel || — || align=right | 3.4 km || 
|-id=761 bgcolor=#fefefe
| 112761 ||  || — || August 14, 2002 || Bergisch Gladbach || W. Bickel || — || align=right | 1.6 km || 
|-id=762 bgcolor=#fefefe
| 112762 ||  || — || August 15, 2002 || Bergisch Gladbach || W. Bickel || — || align=right | 1.3 km || 
|-id=763 bgcolor=#E9E9E9
| 112763 ||  || — || August 1, 2002 || Socorro || LINEAR || — || align=right | 2.9 km || 
|-id=764 bgcolor=#d6d6d6
| 112764 ||  || — || August 8, 2002 || Palomar || NEAT || EUP || align=right | 6.4 km || 
|-id=765 bgcolor=#E9E9E9
| 112765 ||  || — || August 8, 2002 || Palomar || S. F. Hönig || — || align=right | 1.7 km || 
|-id=766 bgcolor=#E9E9E9
| 112766 ||  || — || August 8, 2002 || Palomar || S. F. Hönig || NEM || align=right | 5.6 km || 
|-id=767 bgcolor=#fefefe
| 112767 ||  || — || August 8, 2002 || Palomar || S. F. Hönig || MAS || align=right | 1.2 km || 
|-id=768 bgcolor=#d6d6d6
| 112768 ||  || — || August 8, 2002 || Palomar || S. F. Hönig || — || align=right | 3.9 km || 
|-id=769 bgcolor=#d6d6d6
| 112769 ||  || — || August 8, 2002 || Palomar || S. F. Hönig || — || align=right | 3.4 km || 
|-id=770 bgcolor=#E9E9E9
| 112770 ||  || — || August 8, 2002 || Palomar || S. F. Hönig || HEN || align=right | 3.8 km || 
|-id=771 bgcolor=#d6d6d6
| 112771 ||  || — || August 8, 2002 || Palomar || S. F. Hönig || — || align=right | 4.6 km || 
|-id=772 bgcolor=#fefefe
| 112772 ||  || — || August 8, 2002 || Palomar || S. F. Hönig || — || align=right | 1.2 km || 
|-id=773 bgcolor=#d6d6d6
| 112773 ||  || — || August 8, 2002 || Palomar || S. F. Hönig || — || align=right | 3.2 km || 
|-id=774 bgcolor=#E9E9E9
| 112774 ||  || — || August 8, 2002 || Palomar || S. F. Hönig || — || align=right | 3.6 km || 
|-id=775 bgcolor=#fefefe
| 112775 ||  || — || August 8, 2002 || Palomar || S. F. Hönig || — || align=right | 1.1 km || 
|-id=776 bgcolor=#d6d6d6
| 112776 ||  || — || August 8, 2002 || Palomar || S. F. Hönig || KAR || align=right | 1.7 km || 
|-id=777 bgcolor=#E9E9E9
| 112777 ||  || — || August 8, 2002 || Palomar || S. F. Hönig || — || align=right | 4.6 km || 
|-id=778 bgcolor=#d6d6d6
| 112778 ||  || — || August 8, 2002 || Palomar || S. F. Hönig || — || align=right | 3.9 km || 
|-id=779 bgcolor=#d6d6d6
| 112779 ||  || — || August 8, 2002 || Palomar || S. F. Hönig || KAR || align=right | 1.9 km || 
|-id=780 bgcolor=#d6d6d6
| 112780 ||  || — || August 8, 2002 || Palomar || S. F. Hönig || — || align=right | 3.2 km || 
|-id=781 bgcolor=#d6d6d6
| 112781 ||  || — || August 8, 2002 || Palomar || S. F. Hönig || KOR || align=right | 2.4 km || 
|-id=782 bgcolor=#E9E9E9
| 112782 ||  || — || August 8, 2002 || Palomar || S. F. Hönig || NEM || align=right | 4.1 km || 
|-id=783 bgcolor=#d6d6d6
| 112783 ||  || — || August 8, 2002 || Palomar || S. F. Hönig || — || align=right | 3.9 km || 
|-id=784 bgcolor=#E9E9E9
| 112784 ||  || — || August 8, 2002 || Palomar || S. F. Hönig || — || align=right | 2.0 km || 
|-id=785 bgcolor=#d6d6d6
| 112785 ||  || — || August 8, 2002 || Palomar || S. F. Hönig || KOR || align=right | 3.0 km || 
|-id=786 bgcolor=#E9E9E9
| 112786 ||  || — || August 8, 2002 || Palomar || S. F. Hönig || HEN || align=right | 1.8 km || 
|-id=787 bgcolor=#d6d6d6
| 112787 ||  || — || August 8, 2002 || Palomar || S. F. Hönig || — || align=right | 5.8 km || 
|-id=788 bgcolor=#E9E9E9
| 112788 ||  || — || August 8, 2002 || Palomar || S. F. Hönig || — || align=right | 4.3 km || 
|-id=789 bgcolor=#fefefe
| 112789 ||  || — || August 8, 2002 || Palomar || S. F. Hönig || MAS || align=right | 1.6 km || 
|-id=790 bgcolor=#fefefe
| 112790 ||  || — || August 8, 2002 || Palomar || S. F. Hönig || NYS || align=right | 1.1 km || 
|-id=791 bgcolor=#d6d6d6
| 112791 ||  || — || August 8, 2002 || Palomar || S. F. Hönig || — || align=right | 3.6 km || 
|-id=792 bgcolor=#fefefe
| 112792 ||  || — || August 8, 2002 || Palomar || S. F. Hönig || NYS || align=right | 1.0 km || 
|-id=793 bgcolor=#d6d6d6
| 112793 ||  || — || August 8, 2002 || Palomar || S. F. Hönig || — || align=right | 4.5 km || 
|-id=794 bgcolor=#fefefe
| 112794 ||  || — || August 8, 2002 || Palomar || S. F. Hönig || — || align=right | 1.5 km || 
|-id=795 bgcolor=#d6d6d6
| 112795 ||  || — || August 8, 2002 || Palomar || S. F. Hönig || HYG || align=right | 3.4 km || 
|-id=796 bgcolor=#E9E9E9
| 112796 ||  || — || August 8, 2002 || Palomar || S. F. Hönig || — || align=right | 3.8 km || 
|-id=797 bgcolor=#fefefe
| 112797 Grantjudy ||  ||  || August 9, 2002 || Haleakala || A. Lowe || — || align=right | 1.2 km || 
|-id=798 bgcolor=#d6d6d6
| 112798 Kelindsey ||  ||  || August 8, 2002 || Palomar || A. Lowe || — || align=right | 3.3 km || 
|-id=799 bgcolor=#E9E9E9
| 112799 ||  || — || August 8, 2002 || Palomar || A. Lowe || — || align=right | 3.0 km || 
|-id=800 bgcolor=#d6d6d6
| 112800 ||  || — || August 11, 2002 || Palomar || NEAT || — || align=right | 4.2 km || 
|}

112801–112900 

|-bgcolor=#d6d6d6
| 112801 ||  || — || August 8, 2002 || Palomar || NEAT || KOR || align=right | 2.7 km || 
|-id=802 bgcolor=#fefefe
| 112802 ||  || — || August 8, 2002 || Palomar || NEAT || MAS || align=right | 1.2 km || 
|-id=803 bgcolor=#fefefe
| 112803 || 2002 QG || — || August 16, 2002 || Socorro || LINEAR || FLO || align=right | 1.1 km || 
|-id=804 bgcolor=#d6d6d6
| 112804 || 2002 QR || — || August 16, 2002 || Anderson Mesa || LONEOS || ALA || align=right | 9.6 km || 
|-id=805 bgcolor=#E9E9E9
| 112805 ||  || — || August 16, 2002 || Haleakala || NEAT || MAR || align=right | 2.3 km || 
|-id=806 bgcolor=#E9E9E9
| 112806 ||  || — || August 16, 2002 || Haleakala || NEAT || — || align=right | 1.7 km || 
|-id=807 bgcolor=#d6d6d6
| 112807 ||  || — || August 16, 2002 || Haleakala || NEAT || — || align=right | 6.5 km || 
|-id=808 bgcolor=#E9E9E9
| 112808 ||  || — || August 16, 2002 || Haleakala || NEAT || HOF || align=right | 6.2 km || 
|-id=809 bgcolor=#E9E9E9
| 112809 ||  || — || August 16, 2002 || Palomar || NEAT || HOF || align=right | 6.2 km || 
|-id=810 bgcolor=#d6d6d6
| 112810 ||  || — || August 16, 2002 || Palomar || NEAT || EOS || align=right | 3.6 km || 
|-id=811 bgcolor=#d6d6d6
| 112811 ||  || — || August 16, 2002 || Palomar || NEAT || CHA || align=right | 3.9 km || 
|-id=812 bgcolor=#d6d6d6
| 112812 ||  || — || August 16, 2002 || Palomar || NEAT || — || align=right | 5.4 km || 
|-id=813 bgcolor=#fefefe
| 112813 ||  || — || August 16, 2002 || Palomar || NEAT || FLO || align=right | 1.2 km || 
|-id=814 bgcolor=#d6d6d6
| 112814 ||  || — || August 16, 2002 || Palomar || NEAT || — || align=right | 7.4 km || 
|-id=815 bgcolor=#d6d6d6
| 112815 ||  || — || August 16, 2002 || Palomar || NEAT || — || align=right | 3.9 km || 
|-id=816 bgcolor=#E9E9E9
| 112816 ||  || — || August 16, 2002 || Palomar || NEAT || — || align=right | 5.6 km || 
|-id=817 bgcolor=#E9E9E9
| 112817 ||  || — || August 16, 2002 || Bergisch Gladbach || W. Bickel || — || align=right | 5.3 km || 
|-id=818 bgcolor=#E9E9E9
| 112818 ||  || — || August 16, 2002 || Anderson Mesa || LONEOS || — || align=right | 7.7 km || 
|-id=819 bgcolor=#d6d6d6
| 112819 ||  || — || August 16, 2002 || Palomar || NEAT || HYG || align=right | 8.4 km || 
|-id=820 bgcolor=#E9E9E9
| 112820 ||  || — || August 16, 2002 || Palomar || NEAT || — || align=right | 4.5 km || 
|-id=821 bgcolor=#E9E9E9
| 112821 ||  || — || August 19, 2002 || Palomar || NEAT || — || align=right | 2.7 km || 
|-id=822 bgcolor=#d6d6d6
| 112822 ||  || — || August 19, 2002 || Palomar || NEAT || 3:2 || align=right | 10 km || 
|-id=823 bgcolor=#E9E9E9
| 112823 ||  || — || August 19, 2002 || Palomar || NEAT || BRG || align=right | 3.1 km || 
|-id=824 bgcolor=#fefefe
| 112824 ||  || — || August 19, 2002 || Palomar || NEAT || V || align=right | 1.3 km || 
|-id=825 bgcolor=#fefefe
| 112825 ||  || — || August 19, 2002 || Palomar || NEAT || V || align=right | 1.1 km || 
|-id=826 bgcolor=#fefefe
| 112826 ||  || — || August 20, 2002 || Palomar || NEAT || — || align=right | 4.3 km || 
|-id=827 bgcolor=#d6d6d6
| 112827 ||  || — || August 20, 2002 || Palomar || NEAT || — || align=right | 4.8 km || 
|-id=828 bgcolor=#FA8072
| 112828 ||  || — || August 24, 2002 || Palomar || NEAT || — || align=right | 1.5 km || 
|-id=829 bgcolor=#fefefe
| 112829 ||  || — || August 26, 2002 || Palomar || NEAT || NYS || align=right | 1.1 km || 
|-id=830 bgcolor=#E9E9E9
| 112830 ||  || — || August 26, 2002 || Palomar || NEAT || — || align=right | 3.1 km || 
|-id=831 bgcolor=#E9E9E9
| 112831 ||  || — || August 26, 2002 || Palomar || NEAT || EUN || align=right | 2.3 km || 
|-id=832 bgcolor=#fefefe
| 112832 ||  || — || August 26, 2002 || Palomar || NEAT || — || align=right | 1.7 km || 
|-id=833 bgcolor=#E9E9E9
| 112833 ||  || — || August 26, 2002 || Palomar || NEAT || — || align=right | 2.1 km || 
|-id=834 bgcolor=#E9E9E9
| 112834 ||  || — || August 26, 2002 || Palomar || NEAT || — || align=right | 2.2 km || 
|-id=835 bgcolor=#d6d6d6
| 112835 ||  || — || August 28, 2002 || Bagnall Beach || G. Crawford || BRA || align=right | 2.5 km || 
|-id=836 bgcolor=#d6d6d6
| 112836 ||  || — || August 27, 2002 || Palomar || NEAT || — || align=right | 3.2 km || 
|-id=837 bgcolor=#fefefe
| 112837 ||  || — || August 27, 2002 || Palomar || NEAT || — || align=right | 1.3 km || 
|-id=838 bgcolor=#d6d6d6
| 112838 ||  || — || August 28, 2002 || Palomar || NEAT || THM || align=right | 4.5 km || 
|-id=839 bgcolor=#d6d6d6
| 112839 ||  || — || August 28, 2002 || Palomar || NEAT || — || align=right | 4.7 km || 
|-id=840 bgcolor=#fefefe
| 112840 ||  || — || August 26, 2002 || Palomar || NEAT || — || align=right | 1.6 km || 
|-id=841 bgcolor=#fefefe
| 112841 ||  || — || August 27, 2002 || Palomar || NEAT || — || align=right | 1.7 km || 
|-id=842 bgcolor=#d6d6d6
| 112842 ||  || — || August 28, 2002 || Palomar || NEAT || LUT || align=right | 6.6 km || 
|-id=843 bgcolor=#fefefe
| 112843 ||  || — || August 28, 2002 || Palomar || NEAT || — || align=right | 1.5 km || 
|-id=844 bgcolor=#d6d6d6
| 112844 ||  || — || August 28, 2002 || Palomar || NEAT || — || align=right | 5.6 km || 
|-id=845 bgcolor=#fefefe
| 112845 ||  || — || August 28, 2002 || Palomar || NEAT || — || align=right | 1.9 km || 
|-id=846 bgcolor=#fefefe
| 112846 ||  || — || August 28, 2002 || Palomar || NEAT || — || align=right | 1.2 km || 
|-id=847 bgcolor=#E9E9E9
| 112847 ||  || — || August 28, 2002 || Palomar || NEAT || — || align=right | 3.3 km || 
|-id=848 bgcolor=#fefefe
| 112848 ||  || — || August 28, 2002 || Palomar || NEAT || NYS || align=right | 1.1 km || 
|-id=849 bgcolor=#E9E9E9
| 112849 ||  || — || August 28, 2002 || Palomar || NEAT || — || align=right | 2.0 km || 
|-id=850 bgcolor=#E9E9E9
| 112850 ||  || — || August 27, 2002 || Palomar || NEAT || — || align=right | 2.5 km || 
|-id=851 bgcolor=#E9E9E9
| 112851 ||  || — || August 27, 2002 || Palomar || NEAT || — || align=right | 1.6 km || 
|-id=852 bgcolor=#fefefe
| 112852 ||  || — || August 27, 2002 || Socorro || LINEAR || PHO || align=right | 2.5 km || 
|-id=853 bgcolor=#d6d6d6
| 112853 ||  || — || August 29, 2002 || Kitt Peak || Spacewatch || KOR || align=right | 2.5 km || 
|-id=854 bgcolor=#E9E9E9
| 112854 ||  || — || August 28, 2002 || Palomar || NEAT || AER || align=right | 2.8 km || 
|-id=855 bgcolor=#fefefe
| 112855 ||  || — || August 28, 2002 || Palomar || NEAT || — || align=right | 1.9 km || 
|-id=856 bgcolor=#fefefe
| 112856 ||  || — || August 29, 2002 || Palomar || NEAT || — || align=right | 1.2 km || 
|-id=857 bgcolor=#d6d6d6
| 112857 ||  || — || August 29, 2002 || Palomar || NEAT || KOR || align=right | 2.6 km || 
|-id=858 bgcolor=#E9E9E9
| 112858 ||  || — || August 29, 2002 || Palomar || NEAT || — || align=right | 5.0 km || 
|-id=859 bgcolor=#E9E9E9
| 112859 ||  || — || August 29, 2002 || Palomar || NEAT || — || align=right | 3.8 km || 
|-id=860 bgcolor=#d6d6d6
| 112860 ||  || — || August 29, 2002 || Palomar || NEAT || — || align=right | 3.3 km || 
|-id=861 bgcolor=#fefefe
| 112861 ||  || — || August 29, 2002 || Palomar || NEAT || — || align=right | 1.5 km || 
|-id=862 bgcolor=#E9E9E9
| 112862 ||  || — || August 29, 2002 || Palomar || NEAT || — || align=right | 4.9 km || 
|-id=863 bgcolor=#d6d6d6
| 112863 ||  || — || August 29, 2002 || Palomar || NEAT || EOS || align=right | 3.3 km || 
|-id=864 bgcolor=#E9E9E9
| 112864 ||  || — || August 29, 2002 || Palomar || NEAT || — || align=right | 2.2 km || 
|-id=865 bgcolor=#E9E9E9
| 112865 ||  || — || August 29, 2002 || Palomar || NEAT || — || align=right | 3.9 km || 
|-id=866 bgcolor=#d6d6d6
| 112866 ||  || — || August 29, 2002 || Palomar || NEAT || — || align=right | 4.2 km || 
|-id=867 bgcolor=#E9E9E9
| 112867 ||  || — || August 29, 2002 || Palomar || NEAT || — || align=right | 1.5 km || 
|-id=868 bgcolor=#d6d6d6
| 112868 ||  || — || August 29, 2002 || Palomar || NEAT || — || align=right | 4.8 km || 
|-id=869 bgcolor=#E9E9E9
| 112869 ||  || — || August 29, 2002 || Palomar || NEAT || PAD || align=right | 3.6 km || 
|-id=870 bgcolor=#E9E9E9
| 112870 ||  || — || August 29, 2002 || Palomar || NEAT || — || align=right | 3.2 km || 
|-id=871 bgcolor=#d6d6d6
| 112871 ||  || — || August 29, 2002 || Palomar || NEAT || — || align=right | 6.3 km || 
|-id=872 bgcolor=#E9E9E9
| 112872 ||  || — || August 30, 2002 || Kitt Peak || Spacewatch || — || align=right | 3.9 km || 
|-id=873 bgcolor=#E9E9E9
| 112873 ||  || — || August 30, 2002 || Kitt Peak || Spacewatch || — || align=right | 2.5 km || 
|-id=874 bgcolor=#E9E9E9
| 112874 ||  || — || August 30, 2002 || Kitt Peak || Spacewatch || PAD || align=right | 4.2 km || 
|-id=875 bgcolor=#fefefe
| 112875 ||  || — || August 30, 2002 || Palomar || NEAT || — || align=right | 1.4 km || 
|-id=876 bgcolor=#E9E9E9
| 112876 ||  || — || August 30, 2002 || Socorro || LINEAR || PAL || align=right | 3.3 km || 
|-id=877 bgcolor=#E9E9E9
| 112877 ||  || — || August 28, 2002 || Palomar || NEAT || — || align=right | 1.8 km || 
|-id=878 bgcolor=#fefefe
| 112878 ||  || — || August 29, 2002 || Palomar || NEAT || — || align=right | 1.7 km || 
|-id=879 bgcolor=#fefefe
| 112879 ||  || — || August 29, 2002 || Palomar || NEAT || NYS || align=right | 1.2 km || 
|-id=880 bgcolor=#d6d6d6
| 112880 ||  || — || August 29, 2002 || Palomar || NEAT || — || align=right | 4.5 km || 
|-id=881 bgcolor=#E9E9E9
| 112881 ||  || — || August 30, 2002 || Palomar || NEAT || — || align=right | 4.6 km || 
|-id=882 bgcolor=#fefefe
| 112882 ||  || — || August 30, 2002 || Palomar || NEAT || NYS || align=right | 1.4 km || 
|-id=883 bgcolor=#fefefe
| 112883 ||  || — || August 30, 2002 || Palomar || NEAT || V || align=right | 1.4 km || 
|-id=884 bgcolor=#E9E9E9
| 112884 ||  || — || August 30, 2002 || Palomar || NEAT || — || align=right | 4.7 km || 
|-id=885 bgcolor=#fefefe
| 112885 ||  || — || August 30, 2002 || Palomar || NEAT || NYS || align=right | 1.3 km || 
|-id=886 bgcolor=#d6d6d6
| 112886 ||  || — || August 30, 2002 || Palomar || NEAT || URS || align=right | 8.5 km || 
|-id=887 bgcolor=#d6d6d6
| 112887 ||  || — || August 30, 2002 || Kitt Peak || Spacewatch || EOS || align=right | 4.0 km || 
|-id=888 bgcolor=#d6d6d6
| 112888 ||  || — || August 30, 2002 || Kitt Peak || Spacewatch || KOR || align=right | 3.5 km || 
|-id=889 bgcolor=#E9E9E9
| 112889 ||  || — || August 31, 2002 || Kitt Peak || Spacewatch || — || align=right | 1.8 km || 
|-id=890 bgcolor=#d6d6d6
| 112890 ||  || — || August 30, 2002 || Palomar || NEAT || — || align=right | 6.0 km || 
|-id=891 bgcolor=#FA8072
| 112891 ||  || — || August 30, 2002 || Anderson Mesa || LONEOS || — || align=right | 1.2 km || 
|-id=892 bgcolor=#E9E9E9
| 112892 ||  || — || August 30, 2002 || Socorro || LINEAR || — || align=right | 2.6 km || 
|-id=893 bgcolor=#E9E9E9
| 112893 ||  || — || August 17, 2002 || Palomar || S. F. Hönig || — || align=right | 2.4 km || 
|-id=894 bgcolor=#E9E9E9
| 112894 ||  || — || August 29, 2002 || Palomar || S. F. Hönig || — || align=right | 1.5 km || 
|-id=895 bgcolor=#d6d6d6
| 112895 ||  || — || August 18, 2002 || Palomar || S. F. Hönig || KOR || align=right | 2.6 km || 
|-id=896 bgcolor=#E9E9E9
| 112896 ||  || — || August 18, 2002 || Palomar || S. F. Hönig || — || align=right | 1.3 km || 
|-id=897 bgcolor=#d6d6d6
| 112897 ||  || — || August 29, 2002 || Palomar || R. Matson || — || align=right | 5.7 km || 
|-id=898 bgcolor=#E9E9E9
| 112898 ||  || — || August 29, 2002 || Palomar || R. Matson || — || align=right | 3.7 km || 
|-id=899 bgcolor=#E9E9E9
| 112899 ||  || — || August 16, 2002 || Palomar || A. Lowe || — || align=right | 1.4 km || 
|-id=900 bgcolor=#E9E9E9
| 112900 Tonyhoffman ||  ||  || August 20, 2002 || Palomar || R. Matson || — || align=right | 2.2 km || 
|}

112901–113000 

|-bgcolor=#fefefe
| 112901 ||  || — || August 16, 2002 || Palomar || A. Lowe || — || align=right | 1.4 km || 
|-id=902 bgcolor=#d6d6d6
| 112902 ||  || — || August 29, 2002 || Palomar || S. F. Hönig || — || align=right | 2.6 km || 
|-id=903 bgcolor=#d6d6d6
| 112903 ||  || — || August 29, 2002 || Palomar || S. F. Hönig || KOR || align=right | 1.9 km || 
|-id=904 bgcolor=#fefefe
| 112904 ||  || — || August 29, 2002 || Palomar || S. F. Hönig || — || align=right | 1.4 km || 
|-id=905 bgcolor=#fefefe
| 112905 ||  || — || August 29, 2002 || Palomar || S. F. Hönig || V || align=right data-sort-value="0.91" | 910 m || 
|-id=906 bgcolor=#fefefe
| 112906 ||  || — || August 29, 2002 || Palomar || S. F. Hönig || NYS || align=right | 1.3 km || 
|-id=907 bgcolor=#d6d6d6
| 112907 ||  || — || August 17, 2002 || Palomar || A. Lowe || — || align=right | 3.2 km || 
|-id=908 bgcolor=#E9E9E9
| 112908 ||  || — || August 29, 2002 || Palomar || S. F. Hönig || HEN || align=right | 1.7 km || 
|-id=909 bgcolor=#E9E9E9
| 112909 ||  || — || August 29, 2002 || Palomar || S. F. Hönig || — || align=right | 1.5 km || 
|-id=910 bgcolor=#E9E9E9
| 112910 ||  || — || August 29, 2002 || Palomar || S. F. Hönig || — || align=right | 4.8 km || 
|-id=911 bgcolor=#d6d6d6
| 112911 ||  || — || August 17, 2002 || Palomar || A. Lowe || — || align=right | 3.9 km || 
|-id=912 bgcolor=#E9E9E9
| 112912 ||  || — || August 29, 2002 || Palomar || S. F. Hönig || HEN || align=right | 1.8 km || 
|-id=913 bgcolor=#E9E9E9
| 112913 ||  || — || August 18, 2002 || Palomar || S. F. Hönig || — || align=right | 1.7 km || 
|-id=914 bgcolor=#d6d6d6
| 112914 ||  || — || August 17, 2002 || Palomar || NEAT || — || align=right | 4.9 km || 
|-id=915 bgcolor=#E9E9E9
| 112915 ||  || — || August 16, 2002 || Palomar || NEAT || ADE || align=right | 5.1 km || 
|-id=916 bgcolor=#E9E9E9
| 112916 ||  || — || August 17, 2002 || Palomar || NEAT || AGN || align=right | 2.2 km || 
|-id=917 bgcolor=#d6d6d6
| 112917 ||  || — || August 27, 2002 || Palomar || NEAT || — || align=right | 4.0 km || 
|-id=918 bgcolor=#E9E9E9
| 112918 ||  || — || August 17, 2002 || Palomar || NEAT || — || align=right | 4.0 km || 
|-id=919 bgcolor=#E9E9E9
| 112919 ||  || — || August 28, 2002 || Palomar || NEAT || RAF || align=right | 1.4 km || 
|-id=920 bgcolor=#fefefe
| 112920 ||  || — || August 28, 2002 || Palomar || NEAT || V || align=right data-sort-value="0.82" | 820 m || 
|-id=921 bgcolor=#fefefe
| 112921 ||  || — || August 17, 2002 || Palomar || NEAT || NYS || align=right | 1.3 km || 
|-id=922 bgcolor=#d6d6d6
| 112922 ||  || — || August 30, 2002 || Palomar || NEAT || KOR || align=right | 2.1 km || 
|-id=923 bgcolor=#d6d6d6
| 112923 ||  || — || August 27, 2002 || Palomar || NEAT || — || align=right | 4.7 km || 
|-id=924 bgcolor=#E9E9E9
| 112924 ||  || — || August 30, 2002 || Palomar || NEAT || — || align=right | 3.3 km || 
|-id=925 bgcolor=#E9E9E9
| 112925 ||  || — || August 27, 2002 || Palomar || NEAT || — || align=right | 2.9 km || 
|-id=926 bgcolor=#E9E9E9
| 112926 ||  || — || August 18, 2002 || Palomar || NEAT || HEN || align=right | 1.5 km || 
|-id=927 bgcolor=#fefefe
| 112927 ||  || — || August 18, 2002 || Palomar || NEAT || NYS || align=right data-sort-value="0.98" | 980 m || 
|-id=928 bgcolor=#E9E9E9
| 112928 ||  || — || August 30, 2002 || Palomar || NEAT || EUN || align=right | 2.7 km || 
|-id=929 bgcolor=#d6d6d6
| 112929 ||  || — || August 16, 2002 || Haleakala || NEAT || — || align=right | 4.9 km || 
|-id=930 bgcolor=#E9E9E9
| 112930 ||  || — || August 17, 2002 || Palomar || NEAT || — || align=right | 3.6 km || 
|-id=931 bgcolor=#d6d6d6
| 112931 ||  || — || August 29, 2002 || Palomar || NEAT || — || align=right | 3.2 km || 
|-id=932 bgcolor=#d6d6d6
| 112932 ||  || — || September 4, 2002 || Anderson Mesa || LONEOS || THM || align=right | 4.6 km || 
|-id=933 bgcolor=#d6d6d6
| 112933 ||  || — || September 4, 2002 || Anderson Mesa || LONEOS || — || align=right | 4.0 km || 
|-id=934 bgcolor=#d6d6d6
| 112934 ||  || — || September 4, 2002 || Anderson Mesa || LONEOS || — || align=right | 6.1 km || 
|-id=935 bgcolor=#fefefe
| 112935 ||  || — || September 4, 2002 || Anderson Mesa || LONEOS || NYS || align=right | 1.7 km || 
|-id=936 bgcolor=#E9E9E9
| 112936 ||  || — || September 1, 2002 || Palomar || NEAT || MAR || align=right | 1.8 km || 
|-id=937 bgcolor=#fefefe
| 112937 ||  || — || September 1, 2002 || Haleakala || NEAT || — || align=right | 1.6 km || 
|-id=938 bgcolor=#E9E9E9
| 112938 ||  || — || September 3, 2002 || Palomar || NEAT || EUN || align=right | 1.8 km || 
|-id=939 bgcolor=#E9E9E9
| 112939 ||  || — || September 3, 2002 || Palomar || NEAT || — || align=right | 2.6 km || 
|-id=940 bgcolor=#E9E9E9
| 112940 ||  || — || September 3, 2002 || Palomar || NEAT || — || align=right | 2.2 km || 
|-id=941 bgcolor=#d6d6d6
| 112941 ||  || — || September 1, 2002 || Haleakala || NEAT || — || align=right | 5.1 km || 
|-id=942 bgcolor=#d6d6d6
| 112942 ||  || — || September 1, 2002 || Haleakala || NEAT || — || align=right | 4.8 km || 
|-id=943 bgcolor=#fefefe
| 112943 ||  || — || September 1, 2002 || Haleakala || NEAT || — || align=right | 1.4 km || 
|-id=944 bgcolor=#d6d6d6
| 112944 ||  || — || September 1, 2002 || Haleakala || NEAT || — || align=right | 5.7 km || 
|-id=945 bgcolor=#fefefe
| 112945 ||  || — || September 2, 2002 || Kitt Peak || Spacewatch || — || align=right | 1.4 km || 
|-id=946 bgcolor=#E9E9E9
| 112946 ||  || — || September 3, 2002 || Haleakala || NEAT || — || align=right | 2.6 km || 
|-id=947 bgcolor=#fefefe
| 112947 ||  || — || September 3, 2002 || Campo Imperatore || CINEOS || — || align=right | 1.6 km || 
|-id=948 bgcolor=#fefefe
| 112948 ||  || — || September 4, 2002 || Palomar || NEAT || — || align=right | 1.7 km || 
|-id=949 bgcolor=#E9E9E9
| 112949 ||  || — || September 4, 2002 || Palomar || NEAT || — || align=right | 1.5 km || 
|-id=950 bgcolor=#d6d6d6
| 112950 ||  || — || September 4, 2002 || Palomar || NEAT || — || align=right | 7.2 km || 
|-id=951 bgcolor=#E9E9E9
| 112951 ||  || — || September 4, 2002 || Palomar || NEAT || — || align=right | 1.8 km || 
|-id=952 bgcolor=#E9E9E9
| 112952 ||  || — || September 4, 2002 || Palomar || NEAT || — || align=right | 1.6 km || 
|-id=953 bgcolor=#E9E9E9
| 112953 ||  || — || September 4, 2002 || Palomar || NEAT || — || align=right | 4.5 km || 
|-id=954 bgcolor=#d6d6d6
| 112954 ||  || — || September 4, 2002 || Anderson Mesa || LONEOS || — || align=right | 6.3 km || 
|-id=955 bgcolor=#E9E9E9
| 112955 ||  || — || September 4, 2002 || Anderson Mesa || LONEOS || GEF || align=right | 2.1 km || 
|-id=956 bgcolor=#E9E9E9
| 112956 ||  || — || September 4, 2002 || Anderson Mesa || LONEOS || — || align=right | 3.1 km || 
|-id=957 bgcolor=#d6d6d6
| 112957 ||  || — || September 4, 2002 || Anderson Mesa || LONEOS || — || align=right | 6.7 km || 
|-id=958 bgcolor=#fefefe
| 112958 ||  || — || September 4, 2002 || Anderson Mesa || LONEOS || — || align=right | 1.5 km || 
|-id=959 bgcolor=#d6d6d6
| 112959 ||  || — || September 4, 2002 || Anderson Mesa || LONEOS || EOS || align=right | 6.4 km || 
|-id=960 bgcolor=#E9E9E9
| 112960 ||  || — || September 4, 2002 || Anderson Mesa || LONEOS || — || align=right | 3.7 km || 
|-id=961 bgcolor=#E9E9E9
| 112961 ||  || — || September 4, 2002 || Anderson Mesa || LONEOS || — || align=right | 3.2 km || 
|-id=962 bgcolor=#fefefe
| 112962 ||  || — || September 4, 2002 || Anderson Mesa || LONEOS || NYS || align=right | 1.4 km || 
|-id=963 bgcolor=#fefefe
| 112963 ||  || — || September 4, 2002 || Anderson Mesa || LONEOS || NYS || align=right | 2.1 km || 
|-id=964 bgcolor=#fefefe
| 112964 ||  || — || September 4, 2002 || Anderson Mesa || LONEOS || FLO || align=right | 1.2 km || 
|-id=965 bgcolor=#fefefe
| 112965 ||  || — || September 4, 2002 || Anderson Mesa || LONEOS || NYS || align=right | 1.2 km || 
|-id=966 bgcolor=#d6d6d6
| 112966 ||  || — || September 4, 2002 || Anderson Mesa || LONEOS || — || align=right | 6.0 km || 
|-id=967 bgcolor=#E9E9E9
| 112967 ||  || — || September 4, 2002 || Anderson Mesa || LONEOS || — || align=right | 4.7 km || 
|-id=968 bgcolor=#d6d6d6
| 112968 ||  || — || September 4, 2002 || Anderson Mesa || LONEOS || KOR || align=right | 3.2 km || 
|-id=969 bgcolor=#d6d6d6
| 112969 ||  || — || September 4, 2002 || Anderson Mesa || LONEOS || — || align=right | 5.1 km || 
|-id=970 bgcolor=#d6d6d6
| 112970 ||  || — || September 4, 2002 || Anderson Mesa || LONEOS || — || align=right | 6.8 km || 
|-id=971 bgcolor=#d6d6d6
| 112971 ||  || — || September 4, 2002 || Anderson Mesa || LONEOS || — || align=right | 8.6 km || 
|-id=972 bgcolor=#d6d6d6
| 112972 ||  || — || September 4, 2002 || Anderson Mesa || LONEOS || KOR || align=right | 3.0 km || 
|-id=973 bgcolor=#fefefe
| 112973 ||  || — || September 4, 2002 || Anderson Mesa || LONEOS || — || align=right | 1.4 km || 
|-id=974 bgcolor=#d6d6d6
| 112974 ||  || — || September 4, 2002 || Anderson Mesa || LONEOS || — || align=right | 6.4 km || 
|-id=975 bgcolor=#d6d6d6
| 112975 ||  || — || September 4, 2002 || Anderson Mesa || LONEOS || EOS || align=right | 4.3 km || 
|-id=976 bgcolor=#d6d6d6
| 112976 ||  || — || September 4, 2002 || Anderson Mesa || LONEOS || — || align=right | 4.6 km || 
|-id=977 bgcolor=#fefefe
| 112977 ||  || — || September 4, 2002 || Anderson Mesa || LONEOS || ERI || align=right | 2.3 km || 
|-id=978 bgcolor=#fefefe
| 112978 ||  || — || September 4, 2002 || Anderson Mesa || LONEOS || — || align=right | 1.1 km || 
|-id=979 bgcolor=#E9E9E9
| 112979 ||  || — || September 4, 2002 || Anderson Mesa || LONEOS || — || align=right | 2.9 km || 
|-id=980 bgcolor=#E9E9E9
| 112980 ||  || — || September 4, 2002 || Anderson Mesa || LONEOS || — || align=right | 5.1 km || 
|-id=981 bgcolor=#E9E9E9
| 112981 ||  || — || September 4, 2002 || Anderson Mesa || LONEOS || — || align=right | 3.4 km || 
|-id=982 bgcolor=#fefefe
| 112982 ||  || — || September 5, 2002 || Socorro || LINEAR || PHO || align=right | 2.0 km || 
|-id=983 bgcolor=#E9E9E9
| 112983 ||  || — || September 4, 2002 || Anderson Mesa || LONEOS || TIN || align=right | 2.7 km || 
|-id=984 bgcolor=#E9E9E9
| 112984 ||  || — || September 5, 2002 || Anderson Mesa || LONEOS || — || align=right | 6.6 km || 
|-id=985 bgcolor=#FFC2E0
| 112985 ||  || — || September 6, 2002 || Socorro || LINEAR || AMO +1km || align=right | 3.6 km || 
|-id=986 bgcolor=#fefefe
| 112986 ||  || — || September 3, 2002 || Haleakala || NEAT || NYS || align=right | 1.1 km || 
|-id=987 bgcolor=#fefefe
| 112987 ||  || — || September 4, 2002 || Anderson Mesa || LONEOS || — || align=right | 1.4 km || 
|-id=988 bgcolor=#E9E9E9
| 112988 ||  || — || September 4, 2002 || Anderson Mesa || LONEOS || NEM || align=right | 5.4 km || 
|-id=989 bgcolor=#E9E9E9
| 112989 ||  || — || September 4, 2002 || Anderson Mesa || LONEOS || — || align=right | 3.0 km || 
|-id=990 bgcolor=#d6d6d6
| 112990 ||  || — || September 4, 2002 || Anderson Mesa || LONEOS || HYG || align=right | 5.5 km || 
|-id=991 bgcolor=#d6d6d6
| 112991 ||  || — || September 4, 2002 || Anderson Mesa || LONEOS || — || align=right | 5.0 km || 
|-id=992 bgcolor=#d6d6d6
| 112992 ||  || — || September 4, 2002 || Anderson Mesa || LONEOS || VER || align=right | 6.2 km || 
|-id=993 bgcolor=#E9E9E9
| 112993 ||  || — || September 4, 2002 || Anderson Mesa || LONEOS || — || align=right | 2.8 km || 
|-id=994 bgcolor=#d6d6d6
| 112994 ||  || — || September 4, 2002 || Anderson Mesa || LONEOS || — || align=right | 7.6 km || 
|-id=995 bgcolor=#E9E9E9
| 112995 ||  || — || September 4, 2002 || Anderson Mesa || LONEOS || MAR || align=right | 3.1 km || 
|-id=996 bgcolor=#fefefe
| 112996 ||  || — || September 5, 2002 || Anderson Mesa || LONEOS || V || align=right | 1.3 km || 
|-id=997 bgcolor=#d6d6d6
| 112997 ||  || — || September 5, 2002 || Socorro || LINEAR || THM || align=right | 3.8 km || 
|-id=998 bgcolor=#fefefe
| 112998 ||  || — || September 5, 2002 || Anderson Mesa || LONEOS || V || align=right | 1.4 km || 
|-id=999 bgcolor=#E9E9E9
| 112999 ||  || — || September 5, 2002 || Anderson Mesa || LONEOS || — || align=right | 6.0 km || 
|-id=000 bgcolor=#fefefe
| 113000 ||  || — || September 5, 2002 || Anderson Mesa || LONEOS || — || align=right | 1.7 km || 
|}

References

External links 
 Discovery Circumstances: Numbered Minor Planets (110001)–(115000) (IAU Minor Planet Center)

0112